= List of nematode families =

List of Nematoda has 25,000 recorded species from the Nematode phylum. There are estimated to be a million.

== Class Chromadorea ==
Subclass Chromadoria

- Order Araeolaimida
  - Superfamily Axonolaimoidea Filipjev, 1918
    - Axonolaimidae Filipjev, 1918
    - Bodonematidae Jensen, 1991
    - Comesomatidae Filipjev, 1918
    - Coninckiidae Lorenzen, 1981
    - Diplopeltidae Filipjev, 1918
- Order Ascaridida
- Order Chromadorida
  - Suborder Chromadorina
    - Superfamily Chromadoroidea Filipjev, 1917
      - Achromadoridae Gerlach & Riemann, 1973
      - Chromadoridae Filipjev, 1917
      - Cyatholaimidae Filipjev, 1918
      - Ethmolaimidae Filipjev & Schuurmans Stekhoven, 1941
      - Neotonchidae Wieser & Hopper, 1966
      - Selachinematidae Cobb, 1915
- Order Desmodorida
  - Suborder Desmodorina
    - Superfamily Desmodoroidea Filipjev, 1922
      - Desmodoridae Filipjev, 1922
      - Draconematidae Filipjev, 1918
      - Epsilonematidae Steiner, 1927
    - Superfamily Microlaimoidea Micoletzky, 1922
      - Aponchiidae Gerlach, 1963
      - Microlaimidae Micoletzky, 1922
      - Monoposthiidae Filipjev, 1934
- Order Desmoscolecida
  - Suborder Desmoscolecina
    - Superfamily Desmoscolecoidea Shipley, 1896
      - Cyartonematidae Tchesunov, 1990
      - Desmoscolecidae Shipley, 1896
      - †Eophasmidae Poinar, 2011
      - Meyliidae de Coninck, 1965
- Order Monhysterida
  - Suborder Linhomoeina
    - Superfamily Siphonolaimoidea Filipjev, 1918
      - Fusivermidae Tchesunov, 1996
      - Linhomoeidae Filipjev, 1922
      - Siphonolaimidae Filipjev, 1918
  - Suborder Monhysterina
    - Superfamily Monhysteroidea Filipjev, 1929
      - Monhysteridae de Man, 1876
    - Superfamily Sphaerolaimoidea Filipjev, 1918
      - Sphaerolaimidae Filipjev, 1918
      - Xyalidae Chitwood, 1951
- Order Plectida
  - Suborder Ceramonematina
    - Superfamily Ceramonematoidea Cobb, 1933
      - Ceramonematidae Cobb, 1933
      - Diplopeltoididae Tchesunov, 1990
      - Paramicrolaimidae Lorenzen, 1981
      - Tarvaiidae Lorenzen, 1981
      - Tubolaimoididae Lorenzen, 1981
  - Incertae sedis
    - Superfamily Haliplectoidea Chitwood, 1951
      - Haliplectidae Chitwood, 1951
    - Aegialoalaimidae Lorenzen, 1981
    - Aulolaimidae Jairajpuri & Hopper, 1968
  - Suborder Plectina
    - Superfamily Camacolaimoidea Micoletzky, 1924
      - Camacolaimidae Micoletzky, 1924
      - Rhadinematidae Lorenzen, 1981
    - Superfamily Leptolaimoidea Örley, 1880
      - Aphanolaimidae Chitwood, 1936
      - Leptolaimidae Örley, 1880
    - Superfamily Ohridioidea (Andrassy, 1976)
      - Creagrocercidae Baylis, 1943
      - Ohridiidae Andrássy, 1976
    - Superfamily Plectoidea Örley, 1880
      - Chronogastridae Gagarin, 1975
      - Metateratocephalidae Eroshenko, 1973
      - Plectidae Örley, 1880
- Order Rhabditida
  - Incertae sedis
    - Brevibuccidae Paramonov, 1956
    - Chambersiellidae Thorne, 1937
    - Teratocephalidae Andrassy, 1958
  - Suborder Myolaimina
    - Superfamily Myolaimoidea Andrassy, 1958
      - Myolaimidae Andrassy, 1958
  - Suborder Rhabditina
    - Infraorder Bunonematomorpha
      - Superfamily Bunonematoidea Micoletzky, 1922
        - Bunonematidae Micoletzky, 1922
        - Pterygorhabditidae Goodey, 1963
    - Infraorder Diplogasteromorpha
      - Superfamily Cylindrocorporoidea Goodey, 1939
        - Cylindrocorporidae Goodey, 1939
      - Superfamily Diplogasteroidea Micoletzky, 1922
        - Cephalobiidae Filipjev, 1934
        - Diplogasteridae Micoletzky, 1922
        - Diplogasteroididae Filipjev & Schuurmans Stekhoven, 1941
        - Mehdinematidae Farooqui, 1967
        - Neodiplogasteridae Paramonov, 1952
        - Pseudodiplogasteroididae Körner, 1954
      - Superfamily Odontopharyngoidea Micoletzky, 1922
        - Odontopharyngidae Micoletzky, 1922
    - Infraorder Rhabditomorpha
      - Incertae sedis
        - Agfidae Dougherty, 1955
        - Carabonematidae Stammer & Wachek, 1952
      - Superfamily Mesorhabditoidea Andrassy, 1976
        - Mesorhabditidae Andrassy, 1976
        - Peloderidae Andrassy, 1976
      - Superfamily Rhabditoidea Örley, 1880
        - Diploscapteridae Micoletzky, 1922
        - Rhabditidae Örley, 1880
      - Superfamily Strongyloidea Baird, 1853
        - Ancylostomatidae Looss, 1905
        - Diaphanocephalidae Travassos, 1920
        - Heligmosomidae Cram, 1927
        - Heterorhabditidae Poinar, 1976
        - Metastrongylidae Diesing, 1851
        - Moleinidae Durette-Desset & Chabaud, 1977
        - Strongylidae Baird, 1853
        - Trichostrongylidae Leiper, 1912
  - Suborder Spirurina
    - Infraorder Ascaridomorpha
      - Superfamily Ascaridoidea Baird, 1853
        - Acanthocheilidae Wülker, 1929
        - Anisakidae Railliet & Henry, 1912
        - Ascarididae Baird, 1853
        - Heterocheilidae Railliet & Henry, 1915
        - Raphidascarididae Hartwich, 1954
      - Superfamily Cosmocercoidea Travassos, 1925
        - Atractidae Travassos, 1919
        - Cosmocercidae Travassos, 1925
        - Kathlaniidae Travassos, 1918
      - Superfamily Heterakoidea Railliet & Henry, 1912
        - Ascaridiidae Travassos, 1919
        - Aspidoderidae Skrjabin & Shikhobalova, 1947
        - Heterakidae Railliet & Henry, 1912
      - Superfamily Seuratoidea Railliet, 1906
        - Chitwoodchabaudiidae Puylaert, 1970
        - Cucullanidae Cobbold, 1864
        - Quimperiidae Gendre, 1928
        - Schneidernematidae Freitas, 1956
        - Seuratidae Railliet, 1906
      - Superfamily Subuluroidea Yorke & Maplestone, 1926
        - Maupasinidae Inglis, 1959
        - Subuluridae Yorke & Maplestone, 1926
    - Infraorder Gnathostomatomorpha
      - Superfamily Gnathostomatoidea Railliet, 1895
        - Gnathostomatidae Railliet, 1895
    - Incertae sedis
      - Superfamily Dracunculoidea Stiles, 1907
        - Anguillicolidae Yamaguti, 1935
        - Daniconematidae Moravec & Køie, 1987
        - Dracunculidae Stiles, 1907
        - Guyanemidae Petter, 1975
        - Micropleuridae Baylis & Daubney, 1926
        - Philometridae Baylis & Daubney, 1926
        - Skrjabillanidae Shigin & Shigina, 1958
    - Infraorder Oxyuridomorpha
      - Superfamily Oxyuroidea Cobbold, 1864
        - Heteroxynematidae Skrjabin & Shikhobalova, 1948
        - Oxyuridae Cobbold, 1864
        - Pharyngodonidae Travassos, 1919
      - Superfamily Thelastomatoidea Travassos, 1929
        - Hystrignathidae Travassos, 1929
        - Protrelloididae Chitwood, 1932
        - Thelastomatidae Travassos, 1929
        - Travassosinematidae Rao, 1958
    - Infraorder Rhigonematomorpha
      - Superfamily Ransomnematoidea Travassos, 1930
        - Camoyidae Travassos & Kloss, 1960
        - Hethidae Travassos & Kloss, 1960
        - Ransomnematidae Travassos, 1930
      - Superfamily Rhigonematoidea Artigas, 1930
        - Ichthyocephalidae Travassos & Kloss, 1958
        - Rhigonematidae Artigas, 1930
    - Infraorder Spiruromorpha
      - Superfamily Acuarioidea Railliet, Henry & Sisoff, 1912
        - Acuariidae Railliet, Henry & Sisoff, 1912
      - Superfamily Aproctoidea Skrjabin & Shikhobalova, 1945
        - Aproctidae Skrjabin & Shikhobalova, 1945
        - Desmidocercidae Cram, 1927
      - Superfamily Camallanoidea Travassos, 1920
        - Camallanidae Railliet & Henry, 1915
      - Superfamily Diplotriaenoidea Anderson, 1958
        - Diplotriaenidae Anderson, 1958
        - Oswaldofilariidae Chabaud & Choquet, 1953
      - Superfamily Filarioidea Chabaud & Anderson, 1959
        - Filariidae Chabaud & Anderson, 1959
        - Onchocercidae Leiper, 1911
      - Superfamily Habronematoidea Ivaschkin, 1961
        - Cystidicolidae Skrjabin, 1946
        - Habronematidae Ivaschkin, 1961
        - Hedruridae Railliet, 1916
        - Tetrameridae Travassos, 1914
      - Superfamily Physalopteroidea Railliet, 1893
        - Physalopteridae Railliet, 1893
      - Superfamily Rictularoidea Railliet, 1916
        - Rictulariidae Railliet, 1916
      - Superfamily Spiruroidea Oerley, 1885
        - Gongylonematidae Sobolev, 1949
        - Hartertiidae Quentin, 1970
        - Spirocercidae Chitwood & Wehr, 1932
        - Spiruridae Oerley, 1885
      - Superfamily Thelazioidea Skrjabin, 1915
        - Pneumospiruridae Wu & Hu, 1938
        - Rhabdochonidae Skrjabin, 1946
        - Thelaziidae Skrjabin, 1915
  - Suborder Tylenchina
    - Infraorder Cephalobomorpha
      - Superfamily Cephaloboidea Filipjev, 1934
        - Alirhabditidae Suryawanshi, 1971
        - Bicirronematidae Andrassy, 1978
        - Cephalobidae Filipjev, 1934
        - Elaphonematidae Heyns, 1962
        - Osstellidae Heyns, 1962
    - Infraorder Drilonematomorpha
      - Superfamily Drilonematoidea Pierantoni, 1916
        - Drilonematidae Pierantoni, 1916
        - Homungellidae Timm, 1966
        - Pharyngonematidae Chitwood, 1950
        - Ungellidae Chitwood, 1950
    - Incertae sedis
      - Superfamily Anguinoidea Nicoll, 1935
    - Infraorder Panagrolaimomorpha
      - Superfamily Panagrolaimoidea Thorne, 1937
        - Panagrolaimidae Thorne, 1937
      - Superfamily Strongyloidoidea Chitwood & McIntosh, 1934
        - Alloionematidae Chitwood & McIntosh, 1934
        - Rhabdiasidae Railliet, 1916
        - Steinernematidae Filipjev, 1934
        - Strongyloididae Chitwood & McIntosh, 1934
    - Infraorder Tylenchomorpha
      - Superfamily Aphelenchoidea Fuchs, 1937
        - Aphelenchidae Fuchs, 1937
        - Aphelenchoididae Skarbilovich, 1947
      - Superfamily Criconematoidea Taylor, 1936
        - Criconematidae Taylor, 1936
        - Hemicycliophoridae Skarbilovich, 1959
        - Tylenchulidae Skarbilovich, 1947
      - Superfamily Myenchoidea Pereira, 1931
        - Myenchidae Pereira, 1931
      - Superfamily Sphaerularioidea Lubbock, 1861
        - Anguinidae Nicoll, 1935
        - Iotonchidae Goodey, 1935
        - Neotylenchidae Thorne, 1941
        - Sphaerulariidae Lubbock, 1861
      - Superfamily Tylenchoidea Örley, 1880
        - Belonolaimidae Whitehead, 1959
        - Dolichodoridae Chitwood, 1950
        - Hoplolaimidae Filipjev, 1934
        - Meloidogynidae Skarbilovich, 1959
        - Pratylenchidae Thorne, 1949
        - Tylenchidae Örley, 1880
- Order Spirurida
  - Suborder Camallanina
- Order Strongylida
  - Superfamily Metastrongyloidea Lane, 1917
    - Pseudaliidae Railliet & Henry, 1909
  - Superfamily Trichostrongyloidea (Durette-Desset, 1985)
    - Amidostomatidae Baylis & Daubney, 1926

== Class Enoplea ==
=== Subclass Dorylaimia ===
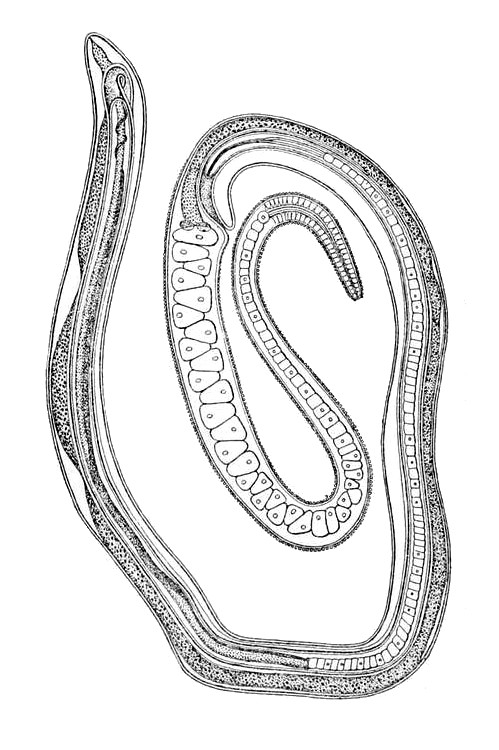
Trichosomoides crassicauda

- Order Dioctophymatida
  - Suborder Dioctophymatina
    - Dioctophymidae Railliet, 1915
    - Soboliphymatidae Petrov, 1930
- Order Dorylaimida
  - Suborder Dorylaimina
    - Superfamily Belondiroidea Thorne, 1964
      - Belondiridae Thorne, 1939
    - Superfamily Dorylaimoidea de Man, 1876
      - Actinolaimidae Thorne, 1939
      - Aporcelaimidae Heyns, 1965
      - Dorylaimidae de Man, 1876
      - Longidoridae Thorne, 1935
      - Nordiidae Jairajpuri & Siddiqi, 1964
      - Qudsianematidae Jairajpuri, 1965
    - Incertae sedis
      - Thornenematidae Siddiqi, 1969
      - Thorniidae de Coninck, 1965
    - Superfamily Tylencholaimoidea Filipjev, 1934
      - Aulolaimoididae Jairajpuri, 1964
      - Leptonchidae Thorne, 1935
      - Mydonomidae Thorne, 1964
      - Tylencholaimellidae Jairajpuri, 1964
      - Tylencholaimidae Filipjev, 1934
  - Suborder Nygolaimina
    - Superfamily Nygolaimoidea Thorne, 1935
      - Aetholaimidae Jairajpuri, 1965
      - Nygellidae Andrassy, 1958
      - Nygolaimellidae Clark, 1961
      - Nygolaimidae Thorne, 1935
- Order Isolaimida
  - Superfamily Isolaimoidea Timm, 1969
    - Isolaimiidae Cobb, 1920
- Order Marimermithida
  - Marimermithidae Rubtzov & Platonova, 1974
- Order Mermithida
  - Suborder Mermithina
    - Superfamily Mermithoidea Braun, 1883
      - Mermithidae Braun, 1883
      - Tetradonematidae Cobb, 1919
- Order Mononchida
  - Suborder Bathyodontina
    - Superfamily Cryptonchoidea Chitwood, 1937
      - Bathyodontidae Clark, 1961
      - Cryptonchidae Chitwood, 1937
    - Superfamily Mononchuloidea de Coninck, 1965
      - Mononchulidae de Coninck, 1965
  - Suborder Mononchina
    - Superfamily Anatonchoidea Jairajpuri, 1969
      - Anatonchidae Jairajpuri, 1969
    - Incertae sedis
      - Cobbonchidae Jairajpuri, 1969
      - Iotonchidae Jairajpuri, 1969
    - Superfamily Mononchoidea Filipjev, 1934
      - Mononchidae Filipjev, 1934
      - Mylonchulidae Jairajpuri, 1969
- Order Muspiceida
  - Suborder Muspiceina
    - Muspiceidae Bain & Chabaud, 1959
    - Robertdollfusiidae Chabaud & Campana, 1950
- Order Trichinellida
  - Superfamily Trichinelloidea Ward, 1907
    - Anatrichosomatidae Yamaguti, 1961
    - Capillariidae Railliet, 1915
    - Cystoopsidae Skrjabin, 1923
    - Trichinellidae Ward, 1907
    - Trichosomoididae Yorke & Maplestone, 1926
    - Trichuridae Railliet, 1915

=== Subclass Enoplia ===
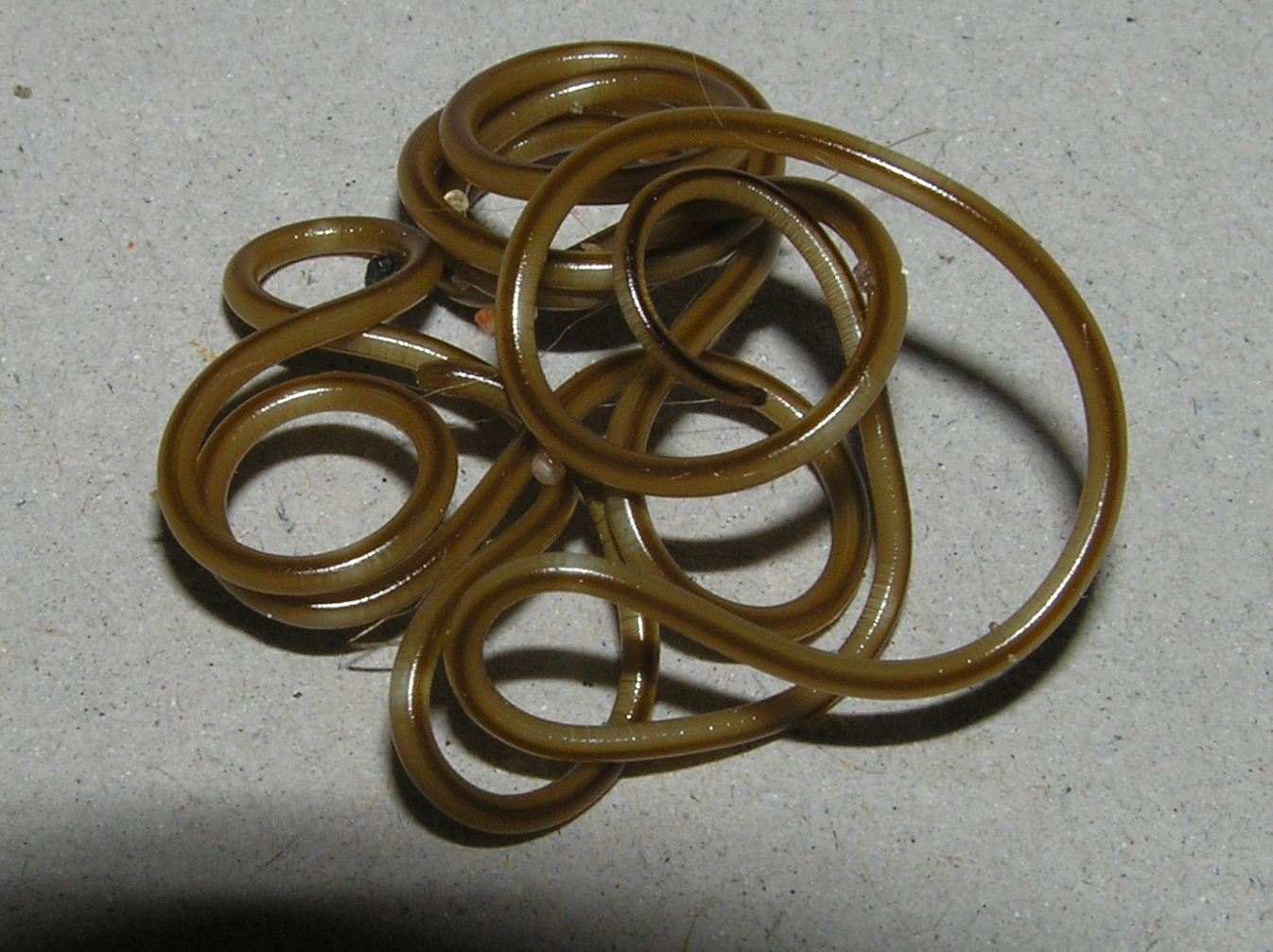
Mermis nigrescens

- Order Enoplida
  - Suborder Alaimina
    - Superfamily Alaimoidea Micoletzky, 1922
      - Alaimidae Micoletzky, 1922
  - Suborder Campydorina
    - Superfamily Campydoroidea Jairajpuri, 1976
      - Campydoridae (Thorne, 1935)
  - Suborder Dioctophymina
  - Suborder Enoplina
    - Superfamily Enoploidea Dujardin, 1845
      - Anoplostomatidae Gerlach & Riemann, 1974
      - Anticomidae Filipjev, 1918
      - Enoplidae Dujardin, 1845
      - Phanodermatidae Filipjev, 1927
      - Thoracostomopsidae Filipjev, 1927
  - Incertae sedis
    - Andrassyidae Tchesunov & Gagarin, 1999
  - Suborder Ironina
    - Superfamily Ironoidea de Man, 1876
      - Ironidae de Man, 1876
      - Leptosomatidae Filipjev, 1916
      - Oxystominidae Chitwood, 1935
  - Suborder Oncholaimina
    - Superfamily Oncholaimoidea Filipjev, 1916
      - Enchelidiidae Filipjev, 1918
      - Oncholaimidae Filipjev, 1916
      - Thalassogeneridae Orton Williams & Jairajpuri, 1984
  - Suborder Trefusiina
    - Superfamily Trefusioidea Gerlach, 1966
      - Lauratonematidae Gerlach, 1953
      - Simpliconematidae Blome & Schrage, 1985
      - Trefusiidae Gerlach, 1966
      - Trischistomatidae Andrassy, 2007
      - Xenellidae de Coninck, 1965
  - Suborder Trichinellina
  - Suborder Tripyloidina
    - Superfamily Tripyloidoidea Filipjev, 1928
      - Tripyloididae Filipjev, 1918
- Order Triplonchida
  - Suborder Diphtherophorina
    - Superfamily Diphtherophoroidea Micoletzkyi, 1922
      - Diphtherophoridae Micoletzky, 1922
      - Trichodoridae Thorne, 1935
  - Incertae sedis
    - Bastianiidae de Coninck, 1965
    - Odontolaimidae Gerlach & Riemann, 1974
  - Suborder Tobrilina
    - Superfamily Prismatolaimoidea Micoletzky, 1922
      - Prismatolaimidae Micoletzky, 1922
    - Superfamily Tobriloidea Filipjev, 1918
      - Pandolaimidae Belogurov, 1980
      - Rhabdodemaniidae Filipjev, 1934
      - Tobrilidae de Coninck, 1965
      - Triodontolaimidae de Coninck, 1965
  - Suborder Tripylina
    - Superfamily Tripyloidea de Man, 1876
      - Tripyloidea de Man, 1876
      - Tripylidae de Man, 1876

== Incertae sedis ==
- Order Benthimermithida
  - Benthimermithidae Petter, 1980
- Order Rhaptothyreida
  - Rhaptothyreidae Hope & Murphy, 1969

== Class Secernentea ==
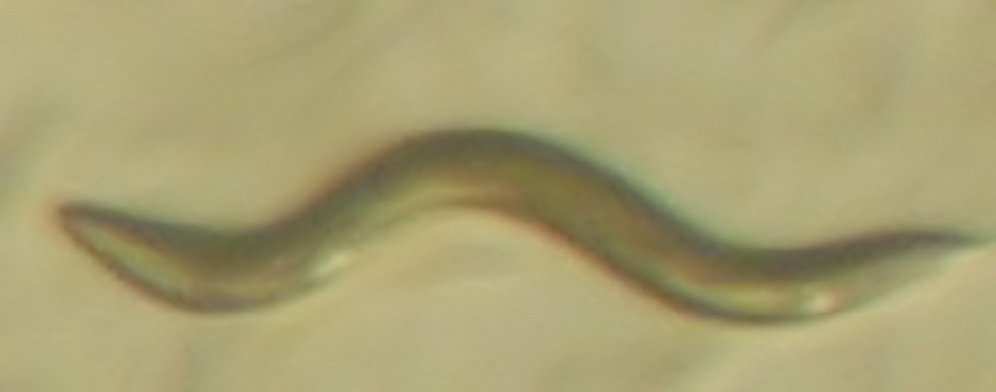
Caenorhabditis elegans

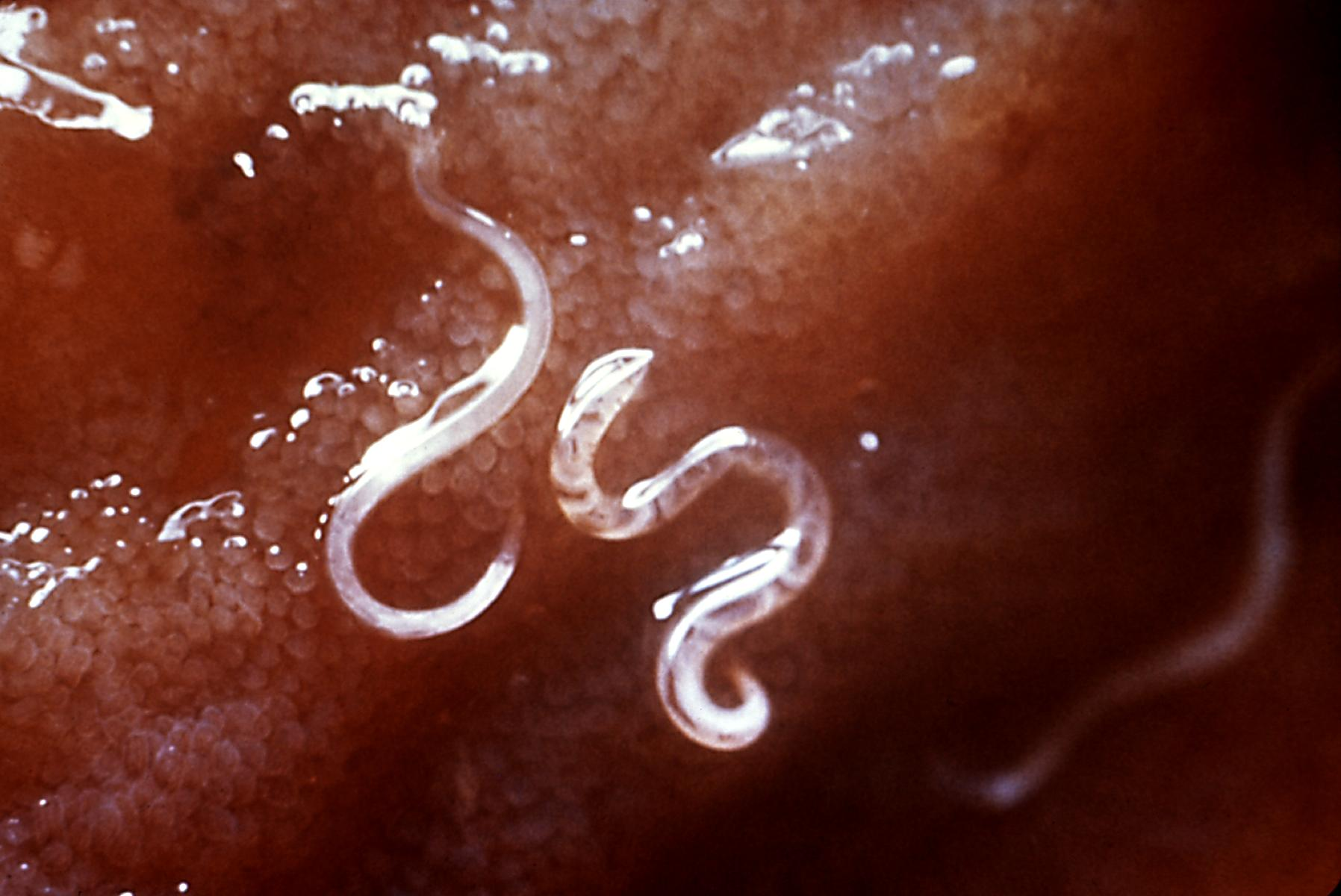
Rhabditia

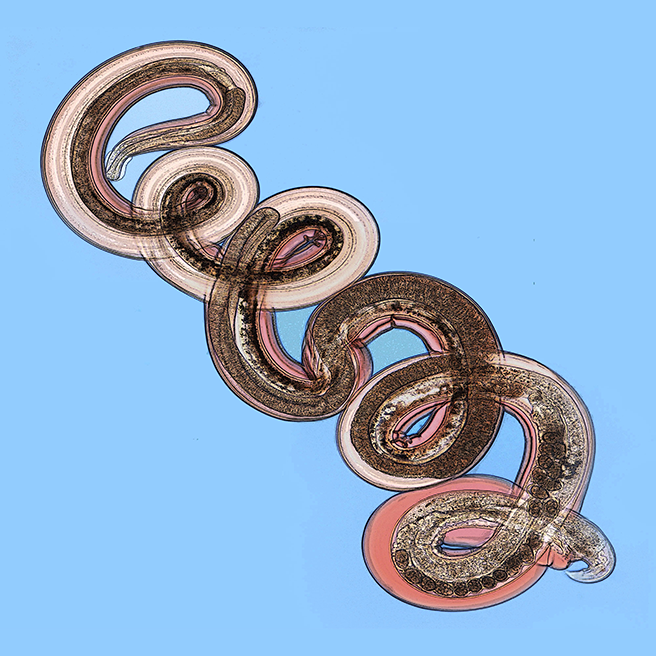
Nippostrongylus brasiliensis

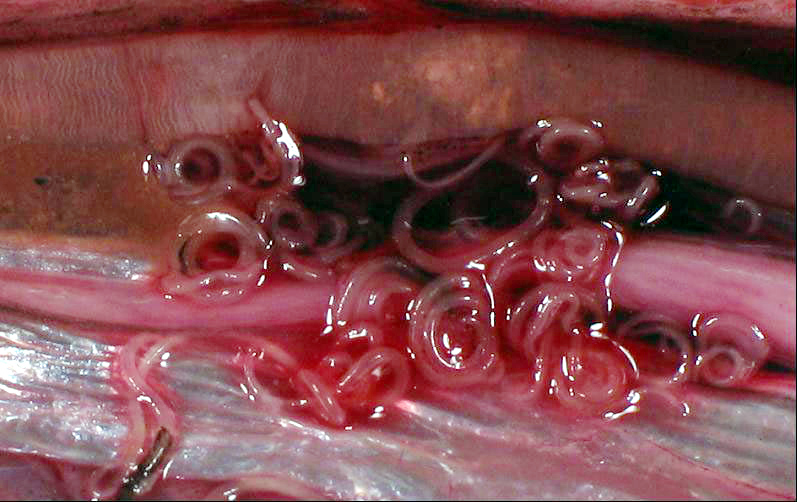
Unidentified Anisakidae (Ascaridina: Ascaridoidea)

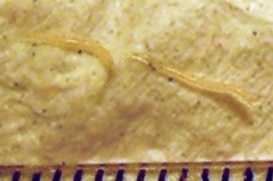
Oxyuridae Threadworm

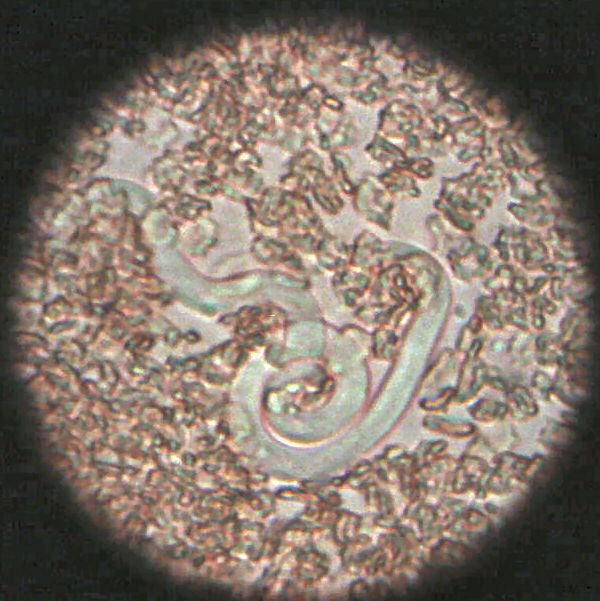
Spiruridae Dirofilaria immitis

- Order Camallanida (sometimes included in Spirurida)
  - Family Anguillicolidae
  - Family Camallanidae
  - Family Dracunculidae
  - Family Micropleudidae
  - Family Philometridae
- Order Drilonematida (sometimes included in Spirurida)
- Order Oxyurida (= Rhabdiasida)
  - Family Heteroxynematidae
  - Family Oxyuridae
  - Family Pharyngodonidae
  - Family Thelastomatidae
- Order Rhigonematida (formerly in Tylenchia)
- Order Spirurida
  - Superfamily Acuarioidea
  - Superfamily Aproctoidea
  - Superfamily Diplotriaenoidea
  - Superfamily Filarioidea
  - Superfamily Gnathostomatoidea
  - Superfamily Habronematoidea
  - Superfamily Physalopteroidea
  - Superfamily Rictularioidea
  - Superfamily Spiruroidea
  - Superfamily Thelazioidea

=== Subclass Diplogasteria ===
(may belong in Rhabditia)

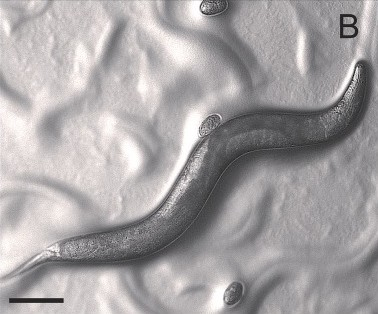
Diplogastridae Pristionchus pacificus

- Order Diplogasterida
- Suborder Chambersiellina Hodda 2007
  - Superfamily Chambersielloidea Thorne 1937
    - Family Chambersiellidae Thorne 1937 (Sanwal 1957)
- Suborder Diplogasterina Paramonov 1952
  - Superfamily Cylindrocorporoidea T. Goodey 1939
    - Family Cylindrocorporidae T. Goodey 1939
    - Family Odontopharyngidae Micoletzky 1922
  - Superfamily Diplogasteroidea Micoletzky 1922
    - Family Cephalobiidae Travassos & Kloss 1960a
    - Family Diplogasteridae Micoletzky 1922
    - Family Diplogasteroididae Paramonov 1952
    - Family Neodiplogasteridae Paramonov 1952
    - Family Pseudodiplogasteroididae De Ley & Blaxter 2002
    - Family Tylopharyngidae Filipjev 1918
- Suborder Myolaimina Inglis 1983
  - Superfamily Carabonematoidea Stammer & Wachek 1952
    - Family Carabonematidae Stammer & Wachek 1952
  - Superfamily Myolaimoidea Goodey 1963
    - Family Myolaimidae Goodey 1963

=== Subclass Tylenchia ===
(may belong in Rhabditia)

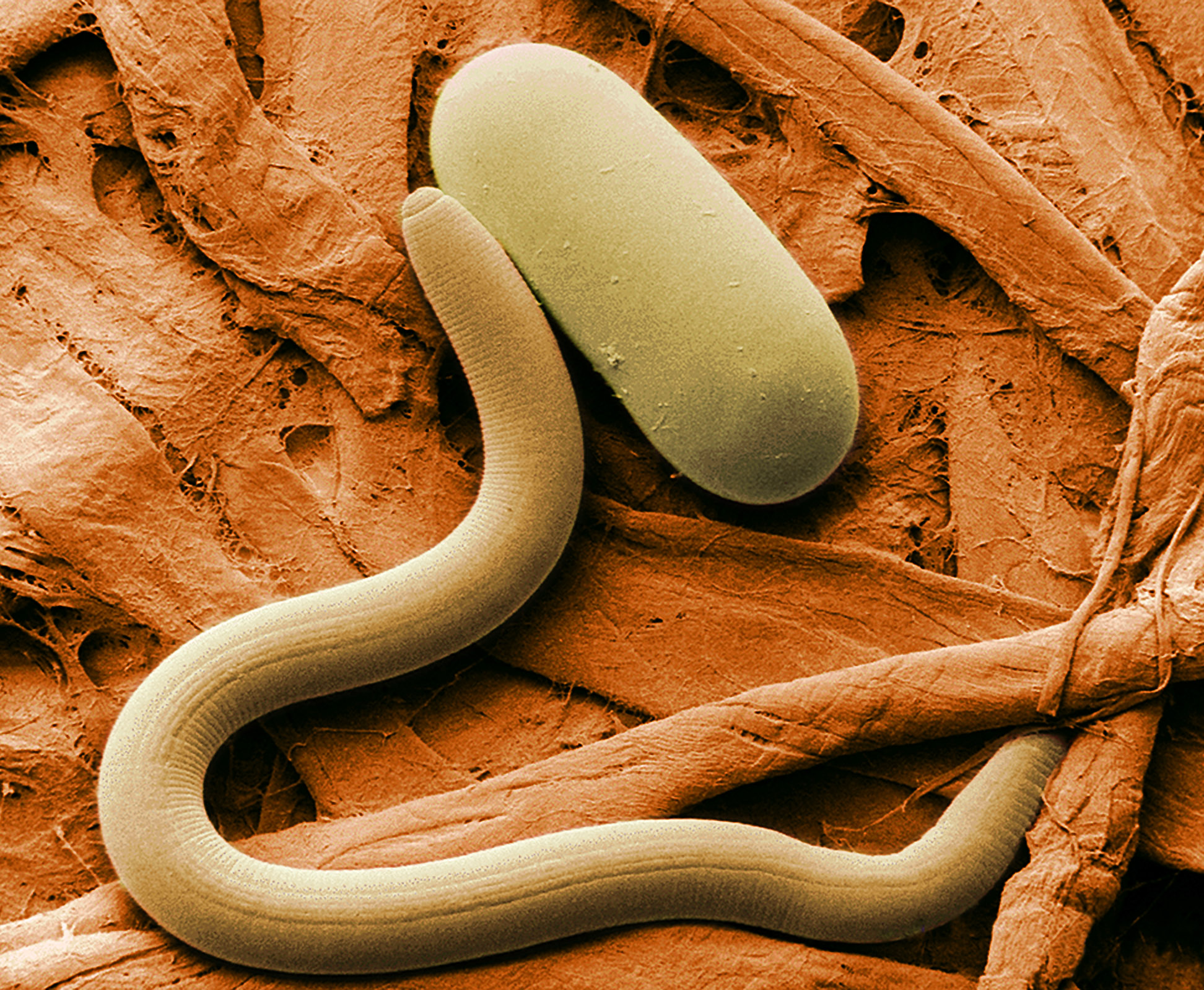
Heterodera glycines worm and egg

- Order Aphelenchida
  - Family Aphelenchidae
  - Family Aphelenchoididae
  - Family Myenchildae
  - Family Paraphelenchidae
- Order Tylenchida
- Superfamily Criconematoidea
  - Family Criconematidae
  - Family Tylenchulidae
- Superfamily Tylenchoidea
  - Family Anguinidae
  - Family Belonolaimidae
  - Family Dolichodoridae
  - Family Ecphyadophoridae
  - Family Hoplolaimidae
  - Family Heteroderidae
  - Family Pratylenchidae
  - Family Tylenchidae
- Superfamily Sphaerularina
  - Family Allantonematidae
  - Family Fergusobiidae
  - Family Iotonchiidae
  - Family Parasitylenchidae
  - Family Sphaerulariidae

== See also ==
- List of nematodes in Sabah
