= List of nematodes in Sabah =

This is a systematic list of 52 species of nematode (Phylum Nematoda) recorded along the coastal area of Sabah, Malaysia. Classification and nomenclature follow Platt & Warwick (1983).

Class	Subclass	Order	Suborder	Family (Wikilinked) Species Habitat*
Adenophorea	Enoplia	Enoplida	Enoplina	Anoplostomatidae Anoplostoma subulatum Gerlach, 1957 MG
Adenophorea	Enoplia	Enoplida	Enoplina	Oxystominidae Halalaimus supercirrhatus Gerlach, 1955 SB/MG Oxystomina elongata (Butschli, 1874) SB
Adenophorea	Enoplia	Enoplida	Enoplina	Oncholaimidae Viscosia meridionalis Kreis, 1932 SB/MG Oncholaimus brachycercus De Man, 1889 MG; Oncholaimus campylocercoides De Coninck & Stekhoven, 1933 SB; Oncholaimus oxyuris Ditlevsen, 1911 SB/MG
Adenophorea	Enoplia	Enoplida	Tripyloidina	Tripyloididae Bathylaimus setosicaudatus Timm, 1961 SB Ingenia mirabilis Gerlach, 1957 SB
Adenophorea	Chromadoria	Chromadorida	Chromadorina	Chromadoridae Chromadorella macris (Gerlach, 1956) SB Chromadorella filiformis (Bastian, 1865) SB; Chromadorita c.f. leuckarti (De Man, 1876) SB; Chromadorita tenuis SB; Hypodontolaimus pumilio Gerlach, 1956 SB/MG; Ptycholaimellus macrodentatus (Timm, 1961) SB/MG
Adenophorea	Chromadoria	Chromadorida	Chromadorina	Cyatholaimidae Acanthonchus cobbi Chitwood, 1951 SB; Marylynnia gerlachi Hopper, 1972 SB/MG; Nannolaimoides decoratus Ott, 1972 SB; Paralongicyatholaimus macramphis Lorenzen, 1972 SB/MG; Xyzzors inglisi Wieser & Hopper, 1967 SB
Adenophorea	Chromadoria	Chromadorida	Chromadorina	Selachinematidae Halichoanolaimus chordiurus Gerlach, 1955 SB/MG Gammanema kosswigi Gerlach, 1964 SB
Adenophorea	Chromadoria	Chromadorida	Chromadorina	Comesomatidae Dorylaimopsis turneri Zhang, 1992 MG Metacomesoma aequale Gerlach, 1956 SB/MG; Paracomesoma inaequale Jensen & Gerlach, 1977 SB
Adenophorea	Chromadoria	Chromadorida	Chromadorina	Desmodoridae Desmodora cazca Nicholas et al., 1988 SB/MG Spirinia parasitifera (Bastian, 1865) SB/MG; Metachromadora onyxoides Chitwood, 1936 SB/MG
Adenophorea	Chromadoria	Chromadorida	Leptolaimina	Leptolaimidae Leptolaimus gerlachi Murphy, 1956 SB Leptolaimus luridus Timm, 1963 SB; Leptolaimus venustus Lorenzen, 1972 SB
Adenophorea	Chromadoria	Chromadorida	Chromadorina	Ceramonematidae Ceramonema filum Gerlach, 1957 SB
Adenophorea	Chromadoria	Chromadorida	Monhysterida	Monhysteridae Sphaerotheristus macrostoma (Timm, 1963) SB
Adenophorea	Chromadoria	Chromadorida	Monhysterida	Xyalidae Rhynchonema cinctum Cobb, 1920 SB Steineria ampullacea Wieser & Hopper, 1967 SB; Daptonema articulatum Lorenzen, 1977 SB/MG; Daptonema kornoeense Allgen, 1929 SB/MG; Daptonema spirum (Gerlach, 1959) SB/MG; Theristus pertenuis Bresslau & Stekhoven, 1935 SB/MG; Stylotheristus mutilus (Lorenzen, 1973) SB/MG
Adenophorea	Chromadoria	Chromadorida	Monhysterida	Sphaerolaimidae Sphaerolaimus penicillus Gerlach, 1956 SB/MG
Adenophorea	Chromadoria	Chromadorida	Monhysterida	Siphonolaimidae Siphonolaimus purpureus (Cobb, 1894) SB
Adenophorea	Chromadoria	Chromadorida	Monhysterida	Linhomoeidae Eleutherolaimus hopperi Timm, 1967 SB/MG Paralinhomoeus conspicuus Gerlach, 1957 SB; Linhomoeus roseus Gerlach, 1963 SB; Metalinhomoeus karachiensis Timm, 1962 SB/MG; Metalinhomoeus insularis Timm, 1967 SB; Terschellingia communis De Man, 1888 SB/MG; Terschellingia longicaudata De Man, 1907 SB/MG; Terschellingioides filiformis Timm, 1967 SB/MG
Adenophorea	Chromadoria	Chromadorida	Monhysterida	Axonolaimidae Parodontophora pacifica (Allgen, 1947) SB/MG; Synodontoides procerus (Gerlach, 1957) MG

- MG - mangrove, SB -sandy beach.
