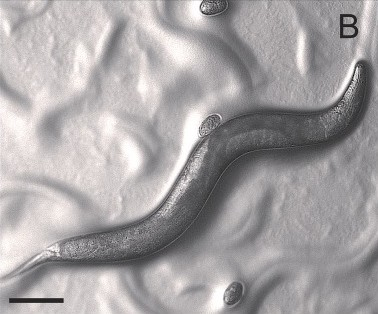
- Diplogastridae Pristionchus pacificus

Scientific classification
- Kingdom: Animalia
- Phylum: Nematoda
- Class: Chromadorea
- Superorder: Rhabditica
- Order: Diplogasterida; Maggenti, 1982

Families
- Cylindrocorporidae; Diplogastridae; Diplogasteroididae; Odontopharyngidae

= Diplogasterida =

Order of roundworms

Diplogasterida was an order of nematodes. It was sometimes placed in a monotypic subclass Diplogasteria, but molecular phylogenetic evidence has shown it to be embedded in the family Rhabditidae (formerly Rhabditina). The confusion of having a hierarchical nesting of groups that were formerly mutually exclusive has led to a profusion of names. Although completely revised taxonomy of nematodes that builds on recent classification systems as well as recent phylogenetic evidence is still necessary, most contemporary taxonomic studies now treat all groups listed under "Diplogasterina" below as a single family, Diplogastridae.

== Subdivisions ==
- Suborder Chambersiellina Hodda 2007
  - Superfamily Chambersielloidea Thorne 1937
    - Family Chambersiellidae Thorne 1937 (Sanwal 1957)
- Suborder Diplogasterina Paramonov 1952
  - Superfamily Cylindrocorporoidea T. Goodey 1939
    - Family Cylindrocorporidae T. Goodey 1939
    - Family Odontopharyngidae Micoletzky 1922
  - Superfamily Diplogasteroidea Micoletzky 1922
    - Family Cephalobiidae Travassos & Kloss 1960a
    - Family Diplogasteridae Micoletzky 1922
    - Family Diplogasteroididae Paramonov 1952
    - Family Neodiplogasteridae Paramonov 1952
    - Family Pseudodiplogasteroididae De Ley & Blaxter 2002
    - Family Tylopharyngidae Filipjev 1918
- Suborder Myolaimina Inglis 1983
  - Superfamily Carabonematoidea Stammer & Wachek 1952
    - Family Carabonematidae Stammer & Wachek 1952
  - Superfamily Myolaimoidea Goodey 1963
    - Family Myolaimidae Goodey 1963
