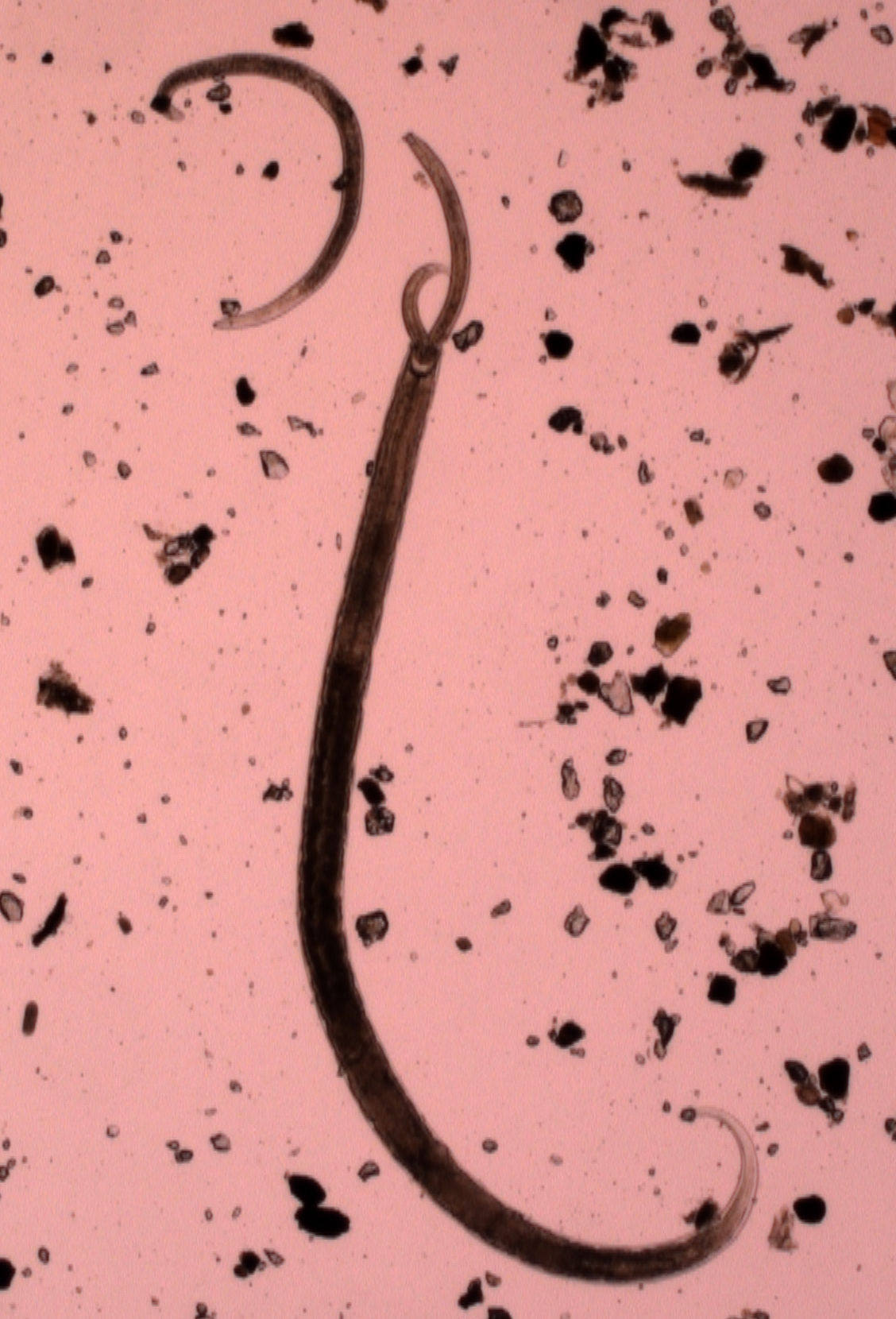

Scientific classification
- Kingdom: Animalia
- Phylum: Nematoda
- Class: Enoplea
- Subclass: Dorylaimia
- Order: Mononchida; Jairajpuri, 1969

Suborders
- See text

= Mononchida =

Monochida

Order of roundworms

Mononchida is an order of nematodes.

== Mononchid Taxonomy ==
Order Mononchida Jairajpuri, 1969 contains two Suborders as follows:

- Suborder Mononchina Kirjanova and Krall, 1969
  - Superfamily Mononchoidea Filipjev, 1934
    - Family Mononchidae Flipjev, 1934
      - Subfamily Mononchinae Flipjev, 1934
      - Subfamily Prionchulinae Andrássy, 1976
    - Family Mylonchulidae Jairajpuri, 1969
      - Subfamily Mylonchulinae Jairajpuri, 1969
      - Subfamily Sporonchulinae Jairajpuri, 1969
    - Family Cobbonchidae Jairajpuri, 1969
      - Subfamily Cobbonchinae Jairajpuri, 1969
  - Superfamily Anatonchoidea Jairajpuri, 1969
    - Family Anatonchidae Jairajpuri, 1969
      - Subfamily Anatonchinae Jairajpuri, 1969
      - Subfamily Miconchinae Andrássy, 1976
    - Family Iotonchidae Jairajpuri, 1969
      - Subfamily Iotonchinae Jairajpuri, 1969
      - Subfamily Hadronchinae Khan and Jairajpuri, 1980
- Suborder Bathyodontina Coomans and Loof, 1970
  - Superfamily Cryptonchoidea Chitwood, 1937
    - Family Cryptonchidae Chitwood, 1937
    - Family Bathyodontidae Clark,1961
  - Superfamily Mononchuloidea De Coninck, 1965
    - Family Mononchulidae De Coninck, 1965

== Bibliography ==
- Lee, Donald L, ed. (2010). The biology of nematodes. London: Taylor & Francis. ISBN 978-0415272117.
