= Rhabdochona papuanensis =

Scientific classification
- Kingdom: Animalia
- Phylum: Nematoda
- Class: Chromadorea
- Order: Rhabditida
- Family: Thelaziidae
- Genus: Rhabdochona
- Species: R. papuanensis

Binomial name
- Rhabdochona papuanensis Moravec et al. 2008

Species of roundworm

Rhabdochona papuanensis is a species of nematode parasite. It parasitises freshwater fishes from Papua New Guinea, particularly Glossamia gjellerupi and Melanotaenia affinis.

== Description ==
Rhabdochona papuanensis differs from its congeners in having hammer-shaped deirids.

This type of parasite is more host specific than other parasites. It is the first species, in its family, to be known of parasitizing Atheriniformes fish. In research from Moravec et al. (2008) Rhabdochona papuanensis is one of the first species of its kind to be recorded in the Australian zoogeographical region.
