= Scolecophilidae =

Scientific classification
- Domain: Eukaryota
- Kingdom: Animalia
- Phylum: Nematoda
- Class: Chromadorea
- Order: Rhabditida
- Suborder: Spirurida
- Family: Scolecophilidae

Family of roundworms

Scolecophilidae is a family of nematodes belonging to the order Spirurida.

Genera:

- Scolecophiloides
- Scolecophilus Baylis & Daubney, 1922
