= Araeolaimus elegans =

Scientific classification
- Kingdom: Animalia
- Phylum: Nematoda
- Class: Chromadorea
- Order: Araeolaimida
- Family: Araeolaimidae
- Genus: Araeolaimus
- Species: A. elegans

Binomial name
- Araeolaimus elegans de Man, 1888

Synonyms
- Araeolaimus ditlevseni Allgén, 1932; Araeolaimus dolichoposthius Ssaweljev, 1912; Araeolaimus punctatus (Cobb, 1920) (as syn according to Gerlach & Riemann, 1973, p. 61); Araeolaimus spectabilis Ditlevsen, 1921; Coinonema punctatum Cobb, 1920

Species of roundworm

Araeolaimus elegans is a species of marine free living nematodes from the North Sea.
