= Skrjabinodon crassicauda =

Scientific classification
- Kingdom: Animalia
- Phylum: Nematoda
- Class: Chromadorea
- Order: Rhabditida
- Family: Pharyngodonidae
- Genus: Skrjabinodon
- Species: S. crassicauda

Binomial name
- Skrjabinodon crassicauda Bursey, Goldberg & Telford, 2007

Species of roundworm

Skrjabinodon crassicauda is a species of gastrointestinal nematodes that completes its life cycle in lizards, first found in Panama.
