= Anguillicolidae =

Scientific classification
- Domain: Eukaryota
- Kingdom: Animalia
- Phylum: Nematoda
- Class: Chromadorea
- Order: Rhabditida
- Suborder: Spirurida
- Family: Anguillicolidae

Family of roundworms

Anguillicolidae is a family of nematodes belonging to the order Spirurida.

Genera:

- Anguillicola Yamaguti, 1935
- Anguillicoloides Moravec & Taraschewski, 1988
- Molnaria
- Skrjabilanus
