= Craspedonema elegans =

Scientific classification
- Kingdom: Animalia
- Phylum: Nematoda
- Class: Chromadorea
- Order: Rhabditida
- Family: Bunonematidae
- Genus: Craspedonema
- Species: C. elegans

Binomial name
- Craspedonema elegans Rahm, 1928

Subspecies
- Craspedonema elegan paulistanum Rahm, 1928

Species of roundworm

Craspedonema elegans is a species of nematodes in the family Bunonematidae found in Brazil.
