= Skrjabinodon caudolumarius =

Scientific classification
- Domain: Eukaryota
- Kingdom: Animalia
- Phylum: Nematoda
- Class: Secernentea
- Order: Oxyurida
- Family: Pharyngodonidae
- Genus: Skrjabinodon
- Species: S. caudolumarius

Binomial name
- Skrjabinodon caudolumarius Bursey, Goldberg & Telford, 2007

Species of roundworm

Skrjabinodon caudolumarius is a species of gastrointestinal nematodes that completes its life cycle in lizards, first found in Panama.
