= Micropleura =

Micropleura may refer to:

- Micropleura (nematode), a genus of nematodes in the family Micropleuridae
- Micropleura (plant), a genus of plants in the family Apiaceae
