= Paragendria papuanensis =

Scientific classification
- Kingdom: Animalia
- Phylum: Nematoda
- Class: Chromadorea
- Order: Rhabditida
- Family: Quimperiidae
- Genus: Paragendria
- Species: P. papuanensis

Binomial name
- Paragendria papuanensis Moravec et al. 2008

Species of roundworm

Paragendria papuanensis is a species of nematode parasite. It parasitises freshwater fishes from Papua New Guinea, particularly Glossamia gjellerupi and Melanotaenia affinis.

== Description ==
It is characterized by the absence of oesophageal teeth, the presence of conspicuously inflated papillae of the last two subventral pairs, a gubernaculum, spicules 69–75 μm long, eggs measuring 57–66 × 39–45 μm, and a small body (between 3.2 and 5.8 millimetres (0.13 and 0.23 in) long).
