= Skrjabinodon =

Scientific classification
- Domain: Eukaryota
- Kingdom: Animalia
- Phylum: Nematoda
- Class: Secernentea
- Order: Oxyurida
- Family: Pharyngodonidae
- Genus: Skrjabinodon; Inglis, 1968

Genus of roundworms

Skrjabinodon is a genus of nematodes belonging to the family Pharyngodonidae.

The species of this genus are found in America, Australia and Malesia.

Species:

- Skrjabinodon alcaraziensis Lafuente & Roca, 1995
- Skrjabinodon caudolumarius Bursey, Goldberg & Telford, 2007
- Skrjabinodon crassicauda Bursey, Goldberg & Telford, 2007
- Skrjabinodon heliocostai Vicente, Vrcibradic, Muniz-Pereira & Pinto, 2000
- Skrjabinodon mascomai Roca, 1985
- Skrjabinodon medinae (Garcia Calvente, 1948)
- Skrjabinodon poicilandri Ainsworth, 1990
- Skrjabinodon spinosulus Vicente, Vrcibradic, Rocha & Pinto, 2002
- Skrjabinodon trimorphi Ainsworth, 1990
