= Alloionema =

Scientific classification
- Kingdom: Animalia
- Phylum: Nematoda
- Class: Chromadorea
- Order: Rhabditida
- Family: Alloionematidae
- Genus: Alloionema; Schneider, 1859

Genus of worms

Alloionema is a genus of terrestrial nematodes within the family Alloionematidae. Members of this genus often parasitize gastropods, such as A. appendiculatum parasitizing Arion vulgaris in Europe where the slug is invasive.

== Species ==
- Alloionema appendiculatum Schneider, 1859
- Alloionema luofuensis Huang, Li & Zhao, 2016
- Alloionema similis Holovachov, Bostrom, De Ley, McDonnell, Alvaredo, Paine & De Ley, 2016
