= Johnstonmawsonia =

Scientific classification
- Kingdom: Animalia
- Phylum: Nematoda
- Class: Chromadorea
- Order: Rhabditida
- Family: Rhabdochonidae
- Genus: Johnstonmawsonia; Campana-Rouget, 1955

Genus of roundworms

Johnstonmawsonia is a genus of nematodes belonging to the family Rhabdochonidae, and was first described in 1955 by Yvonne Campana-Rouget.

The species of this genus are found in Central America.

Species:

- Johnstonmawsonia murenophidis (Campana-Rouget, 1955)
- Johnstonmawsonia porichthydis Tanzola & Gigola, 2002
