= Spiruroidea =

Scientific classification
- Domain: Eukaryota
- Kingdom: Animalia
- Phylum: Nematoda
- Class: Chromadorea
- Order: Rhabditida
- Suborder: Spirurida
- Superfamily: Spiruroidea; Oerley, 1885

Families
- Gongylonematidae Sobolev, 1949; Hartertiidae Quentin, 1970; Spirocercidae Chitwood & Wehr, 1932; Spiruridae Oerley, 1885

Superfamily of roundworms

Spiruroidea is a superfamily of Spirurida.

They are nematodes.
