= Creagrocercidae =

Scientific classification
- Domain: Eukaryota
- Kingdom: Animalia
- Phylum: Nematoda
- Class: Chromadorea
- Order: Rhabditida
- Suborder: Spirurida
- Family: Creagrocercidae

Family of roundworms

Creagrocercidae is a family of nematodes belonging to the order Spirurida.

Genera:

- Creagrocercus Baylis, 1943
