= Xennella =

Scientific classification
- Domain: Eukaryota
- Kingdom: Animalia
- Phylum: Nematoda
- Class: Enoplea
- Order: Enoplida
- Family: Xennellidae
- Genus: Xennella; Cobb, 1920

Genus of nematodes

Xennella is a genus of nematodes belonging to the family Xennellidae.

The species of this genus are found in Europe.

Species:

- Xennella cephalata Cobb, 1920
- Xennella filicaudata Allgén, 1954
- Xennella metallica Tchesunov, 1988
- Xennella suecica Allgén, 1935
