= Acanthocheilus =

Scientific classification
- Kingdom: Animalia
- Phylum: Nematoda
- Class: Chromadorea
- Order: Rhabditida
- Family: Acanthocheilidae
- Genus: Acanthocheilus; Molin, 1858

Genus of roundworms

Acanthocheilus is a genus of nematodes belonging to the family Acanthocheilidae.

The species of this genus are found in Europe and Northern America.

Species:

- Acanthocheilus intermedius Örley, 1895
- Acanthocheilus rotundatus (Rudolphi, 1819)
