= Thelazioidea =

Scientific classification
- Kingdom: Animalia
- Phylum: Nematoda
- Class: Chromadorea
- Order: Rhabditida
- Infraorder: Spiruromorpha
- Superfamily: Thelazioidea

Families
- 3, see text

Superfamily of roundworms

Thelazioidea is a superfamily of spirurian nematodes in the large order Spirurida. Like all nematodes, they have neither a circulatory nor a respiratory system.

Among the families placed here, only the Rhabdochonidae are notably diverse. though none is considered to be monotypic Consequently, the Thelazioidea are among the mid-sized superfamilies of Spirurida.

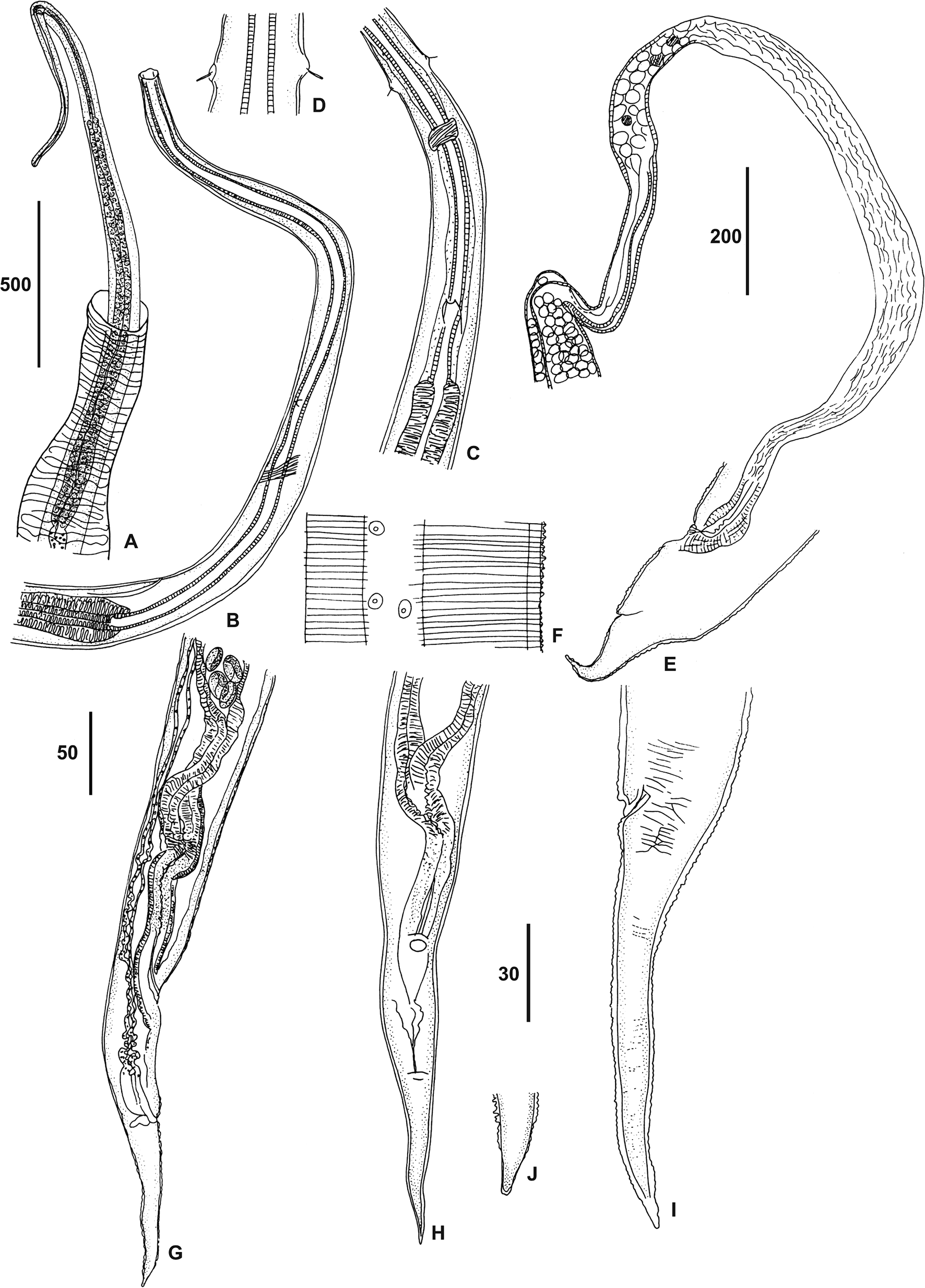
Trichospirura aethiopica Bain & Junker, 2013, an example of Rhabdochonidae

The families of the Thelazioidea are:

- Pneumospiruridae
- Rhabdochonidae
- Thelaziidae
