= Ruizia (disambiguation) =

Ruizia may refer to:

- Ruizia, a genus of plants in the family Malvaceae
- Ruizia, a synonym of Peumus, a genus of plants in the family Monimiaceae
- Ruizia, synonym of Rhigonema, a genus of nematodes in the family Rhigonematidae
- Ruizia, a publication of the Royal Botanical Garden of Madrid
