= Craspedonema =

Scientific classification
- Kingdom: Animalia
- Phylum: Nematoda
- Class: Chromadorea
- Order: Rhabditida
- Family: Bunonematidae
- Genus: Craspedonema; Richters, 1908

Species
- Craspedonema elegans; Craspedonema javanicum; Craspedonema styriacum; Craspedonema zeelandicum

Genus of roundworms

Craspedonema is a genus of nematodes in the family Bunonematidae.
