= Lauratonematidae =

Scientific classification
- Domain: Eukaryota
- Kingdom: Animalia
- Phylum: Nematoda
- Class: Enoplea
- Order: Enoplida
- Family: Lauratonematidae

Family of roundworms

Lauratonematidae is a family of nematodes belonging to the order Enoplida.

Genera:

- Lauratonema Gerlach, 1953
- Lauratonemella Chesunov, 1984
- Lauratonemoides De Coninck, 1965
