= Araeolaimus =

Scientific classification
- Domain: Eukaryota
- Kingdom: Animalia
- Phylum: Nematoda
- Class: Chromadorea
- Order: Araeolaimida
- Family: Araeolaimidae
- Genus: Araeolaimus de Man, 1888

Species
- Many, including: Araeolaimus demani (Schuurmans-Stekhoven, 1950) Wieser, 1956; Araeolaimus elegans de Man, 1888; Araeolaimus penelope; Araeolaimus zosterae

Synonyms
- Coinonema Cobb, 1920 (Gerlach, 1953; Gerlach & Riemann, 1973); Parachromagaster Allgen, 1929 (see Hope & Murphy, 1972)

Genus of roundworms

Araeolaimus is a genus of marine free living nematodes.
