= Protrelloididae =

Scientific classification
- Domain: Eukaryota
- Kingdom: Animalia
- Phylum: Nematoda
- Class: Chromadorea
- Order: Rhabditida
- Family: Protrelloididae

Family of nematodes

Protrelloididae is a family of nematodes belonging to the order Rhabditida.

Genera:

- Napolitana Kloss, 1959
- Protrellatus Farooqui, 1970
- Protrelleta Chitwood, 1932
- Protrelloides Chitwood, 1932
