= Rhabdodemaniidae =

Scientific classification
- Domain: Eukaryota
- Kingdom: Animalia
- Phylum: Nematoda
- Class: Enoplea
- Order: Enoplida
- Family: Rhabdodemaniidae

Family of worms

Rhabdodemaniidae is a family of nematodes belonging to the order Enoplida.

Genera:

- Conistomella Stekhoven, 1942
- Rhabdodemania Baylis & Daubney, 1926
