= Thelastomatidae =

Scientific classification
- Kingdom: Animalia
- Phylum: Nematoda
- Class: Chromadorea
- Order: Rhabditida
- Suborder: Spirurina
- Infraorder: Oxyuridomorpha
- Superfamily: Thelastomatoidea
- Family: Thelastomatidae; Travassos, 1929

Genera
- See text

Synonyms
- Aoruridae; Blattophilidae; Coronostomatidae; Thelastomidae

Family of nematodes

Thelastomatidae is a family of nematodes belonging to the order Rhabditida.

== Genera ==
The Global Biodiversity Information Facility (GBIF) currently recognizes 44 genera in this family:

- Aoruroides Travassos & Klos, 1958
- Aorurus Leidy, 1849
- Bilobostoma Jex, Schneider, Rose & Cribb, 2005
- Blaberinema Garcia & Coy, 1998
- Blatticola Schwenck, 1926
- Blattophila Cobb, 1920
- Blazionema Kloss, 1966
- Cameronia Basir, 1948
- Cephalobellus Cobb, 1920
- Cordonicola Ali & Farooqui, 1969
- Coronostoma Rao, 1958
- Corpicracens Jex, Schneider, Rose & Cribb, 2006
- Corydiella Rao & Rao
- Cranifera Kloss, 1960
- Davenema Mohagan & Spiridonov, 2017
- Desmicola Basir, 1956
- Euryconema Chitwood, 1932
- Fontonema Chitwood, 1930
- Galebia Chitwood, 1932
- Galinanema Spiridonov, 1984
- Geoscaphenema Jex, Schneider, Rose & Cribb, 2006
- Golovatchinema Spiridonov, 1984
- Gryllophila Basir, 1942
- Hammerschmidtiella Chitwood, 1932
- Jaidenema Jex, Schneider, Rose & Cribb, 2006
- Johnstonia Basir, 1966
- Leidynema Schwench, 1929
- Leidynemella Chitwood & Chitwood, 1934
- Malaspinanema Jex, Schneider, Rose & Cribb, 2006
- Paleothelastoma Poinar, 2011
- Paracameronia De Carvalho & Spiridonov, 1991
- Propharyngodon Biswas & Chakravarty
- Protrellima Gambhir & Chinglenkhomba
- Pseudodesmicola Jex, Schneider, Rose & Cribb, 2006
- Schwenckiana Kloss, 1966
- Severianoia (Schwench, 1926) Travassos, 1929
- Stauratostoma Phillips, Pivar, Sun, Moulton & Bernard, 2018
- Suifunema Chitwood, 1932
- Tetleyus Dale, 1964
- Thelastoma Leidy, 1849
- Traklosia Bernard & Phillips, 2015
- Tsuganema Jex, Schneider, Rose & Cribb, 2005
- Wetanema Dale, 1967
