= Diploscapteridae =

Scientific classification
- Kingdom: Animalia
- Phylum: Nematoda
- Class: Chromadorea
- Order: Rhabditida
- Family: Diploscapteridae

Family of roundworms

Diploscapteridae is a family of nematodes (roundworms) belonging to the order Rhabditida.

Genera:

- Carinoscapter Siddiqi, 1998
