= Rhabdochona =

Scientific classification
- Kingdom: Animalia
- Phylum: Nematoda
- Class: Chromadorea
- Order: Rhabditida
- Family: Thelaziidae
- Genus: Rhabdochona

Genus of nematodes

Rhabdochona is a genus of nematodes belonging to the family Thelaziidae.

The species of this genus are found in Northern America.

Species:

- Rhabdochona canadensis Moravec & Arai, 1971
- Rhabdochona cascadilla Wigdor, 1918
