= Skrjabillanidae =

Scientific classification
- Domain: Eukaryota
- Kingdom: Animalia
- Phylum: Nematoda
- Class: Chromadorea
- Order: Rhabditida
- Family: Skrjabillanidae

Family of nematodes

Skrjabillanidae is a family of nematodes belonging to the order Rhabditida.

Genera:

- Esocinema Moravec, 1977
- Kalmanmolnaria Sokolov, 2006
- Lucionema Moravec, Molnar & Szekely, 1998
- Molnaria Moravec, 1968
- Sinoichthyonema Wu, 1973
- Skrjabillanus Shigin & Shigina, 1958
