= Anatonchidae =

Scientific classification
- Kingdom: Animalia
- Phylum: Nematoda
- Class: Enoplea
- Order: Dorylaimida
- Family: Anatonchidae

Family of roundworms

Anatonchidae is a family of nematodes belonging to the order Mononchida.

== Ecology ==
Members of Anatonchidae are predaceous nematodes and natural enemies of other soil micro-organisms, including plant-parasitic nematodes. They belong to the broader group of mononchid nematodes, which play a significant role in regulating populations of other soil organisms and are recognised as potential agents of biological control.

== Genera ==
Genera:

- Anatonchus Cobb, 1916
- Crassibucca Mulvey & Jensen, 1967
- Doronchus Andrassy, 1993
