= Ransomnematidae =

Scientific classification
- Domain: Eukaryota
- Kingdom: Animalia
- Phylum: Nematoda
- Class: Chromadorea
- Order: Rhabditida
- Family: Ransomnematidae

Synonyms
- Ransomnemidae

Family of roundworms

Ransomnematidae is a family of nematodes belonging to the order Rhabditida.

Genera:

- Clementeia Artigas, 1930
- Martadamsonius Van Waerebeke, 1987
- Ransomnema Artigas, 1926
