= Moleinidae =

Scientific classification
- Domain: Eukaryota
- Kingdom: Animalia
- Phylum: Nematoda
- Class: Chromadorea
- Order: Rhabditida
- Family: Moleinidae; Durette-Desset & Chabaud, 1977

Family of roundworms

Moleinidae is a family of nematodes belonging to the order Rhabditida.
