= Ichthyocephalidae =

Scientific classification
- Domain: Eukaryota
- Kingdom: Animalia
- Phylum: Nematoda
- Class: Chromadorea
- Order: Rhabditida
- Family: Ichthyocephalidae

Family of roundworms

Ichthyocephalidae is a family of nematodes belonging to the order Rhabditida.

Genera:

- Ichthyocephaloides Hunt & Sutherland, 1984
- Icthyocephalus Artigas, 1926
- Paraichthyocephalus Travassos & Kloss, 1958
- Xystrognathus Hunt, Luc & Spiridonov, 2002
