= Fusivermidae =

Scientific classification
- Domain: Eukaryota
- Kingdom: Animalia
- Phylum: Nematoda
- Class: Chromadorea
- Order: Monhysterida
- Family: Fusivermidae

Family of roundworms

Fusivermidae is a family of nematodes belonging to the order Monhysterida.

Genera:

- Fusivermis Tchesunov, 1996
