= Camoyidae =

Scientific classification
- Domain: Eukaryota
- Kingdom: Animalia
- Phylum: Nematoda
- Class: Chromadorea
- Order: Rhabditida
- Family: Camoyidae; Travassos & Kloss, 1960

Family of roundworms

Camoyidae is a family of nematodes belonging to the order Rhabditida.
