= Travassosinematidae =

Scientific classification
- Kingdom: Animalia
- Phylum: Nematoda
- Class: Chromadorea
- Order: Rhabditida
- Family: Travassosinematidae

Synonyms
- Chitwoodiellidae; Pulchrocephalidae

Family of nematodes

Travassosinematidae is a family of nematodes belonging to the order Rhabditida.

== Genera ==
Genera:

- Binema Travassos, 1925
- Chitwoodiella Basir, 1948
- Isobinema Rao, 1958
