= Anticomidae =

Scientific classification
- Domain: Eukaryota
- Kingdom: Animalia
- Phylum: Nematoda
- Class: Enoplea
- Order: Enoplida
- Family: Anticomidae

Family of roundworms

Anticomidae is a family of nematodes belonging to the order Enoplida.

Genera:

- Anticoma Bastian, 1865
- Anticomopsis Micoletzky & Kreis, 1930
- Antopus Cobb, 1933
- Cephalanticoma Platonova, 1976
- Odontanticoma Platonova, 1976
- Paranticoma Micoletzky & Kreis, 1930
