= Micropleura (nematode) =

Scientific classification
- Kingdom: Animalia
- Phylum: Nematoda
- Class: Chromadorea
- Order: Rhabditida
- Family: Micropleuridae
- Genus: Micropleura; Linstow, 1906

Genus of roundworms

Micropleura is a genus of nematodes belonging to the family Micropleuridae.

Species:

- Micropleura australiensis Moravec, Ray & Hobbs, 2003;
- Micropleura helicospicula Dey Sarkar, 2003;
- Micropleura indica Khera, 1951;
- Micropleura vazi Travassos, 1933;
- Micropleura vivipara Linstow, 1906.
