= Tylencholaimellidae =

Scientific classification
- Domain: Eukaryota
- Kingdom: Animalia
- Phylum: Nematoda
- Class: Enoplea
- Order: Dorylaimida
- Family: Tylencholaimellidae

Family of roundworms

Tylencholaimellidae is a family of nematodes belonging to the order Dorylaimida.

Genera:

- Athernema Ahmad & Jairajpuri, 1978
- Aulolaimina
- Aulolaimoides Micoletzky, 1915
- Dorella Jairajpuri, 1964
- Doryllium Cobb, 1920
- Oostenbrinkella Jairajpuri, 1965
- Phellonema Thorne, 1964
- Tylencholaimellus Cobb, 1915
