= Bastianiidae =

Scientific classification
- Kingdom: Animalia
- Phylum: Nematoda
- Class: Chromadorea
- Order: Araeolaimida
- Family: Bastianiidae

Family of roundworms

Bastianiidae is a family of nematodes belonging to the order Triplonchida.

Genera:

- Bastiania de Man, 1876
- Dintheria de Man, 1921
