= Diaphanocephalidae =

Scientific classification
- Domain: Eukaryota
- Kingdom: Animalia
- Phylum: Nematoda
- Class: Chromadorea
- Order: Rhabditida
- Family: Diaphanocephalidae

Synonyms
- Cyclicostrongylidae

Family of roundworms

Diaphanocephalidae is a family of nematodes belonging to the order Rhabditida.

Genera:

- Cylicostrongylus Yamaguti, 1961
- Diaphanocephalus Diesing, 1851
- Kalicephalus Molin, 1861
