= Triodontolaimus =

Scientific classification
- Domain: Eukaryota
- Kingdom: Animalia
- Phylum: Nematoda
- Class: Enoplea
- Order: Enoplida
- Family: Triodontolaimidae; De Coninck, 1965
- Genus: Triodontolaimus de Man, 1893
- Species: T. acutus

Binomial name
- Triodontolaimus acutus (Villot, 1875)

Genus of roundworms

Triodontolaimus is a monotypic genus of nematodes belonging to the monotypic family Triodontolaimidae. The only species is Triodontolaimus acutus.

The species is found in Northern Europe.
