= Dorylaimia =

Scientific classification
- Domain: Eukaryota
- Kingdom: Animalia
- Phylum: Nematoda
- Class: Enoplea
- Subclass: Dorylaimia; Inglis, 1983

Orders
- Dioctophymida; Dorylaimida; Mermithida; Mononchida; Trichocephalida

Subclass of roundworms

Dorylaimia is a subclass of nematodes.

== Description ==
In general, members of subclass Dorylaimia exhibit a great diversity of terrestrial and freshwater species, most of which are large predators or omnivorous free-living species. Some are plant parasites, whereas others are animal parasites (Trichinellida and Mermithida). No members of the Dorylaimia are found in marine habitats. Dorylaimia bear an odontostyle, a protrusible, hollow, needlelike tooth for puncturing and emptying food items.

== Taxonomy ==
Phylogenetic analysis of phylum Nematoda suggests three distinct basal clades, the dorylaims, enoplids, and chromadorids. These represent Clades I, II and C+S of Blaxter (1998). Of these, the first two appear to have sister clade status, allowing resolution into two classes, Enoplea and Chromadorea, and division of the former into two subclasses corresponding to Clades I and II respectively, the Enoplia and Dorylaimia. Nevertheless, the possibility remains that Dorylaimia will eventually be shown to be a distinct third class of nematodes.

=== Subdivision ===
Phylogenetic analysis has resulted in a reorganization, with, for instance, moving the Triplonchida to subclass Enoplia.

Subclass Dorylaimia is divided into the following orders;

  - Order Dioctophymatida Baylis and Daubney, 1926
  - Order Dorylaimida Pearse, 1942
  - Order Isolaimida Cobb, 1920
  - Order Marimermithida Rubtzov, 1980
  - Order Mermithida Hyman, 1951
  - Order Mononchida Jairajpuri, 1969
  - Order Muspiceida Bain and Chabaud, 1959
  - Order Trichinellida Hall, 1916
