= Alirhabditis =

Scientific classification
- Kingdom: Animalia
- Phylum: Nematoda
- Class: Chromadorea
- Order: Rhabditida
- Family: Alirhabditidae; Suryawanshi, 1971
- Genus: Alirhabditis; Suryawanshi, 1971

Genus of roundworms

Alirhabditis is a genus of nematodes belonging to the monotypic family Alirhabditidae.

The species of this genus are found in Central America.

Species:

- Alirhabditis clavata Nesterov, 1979
- Alirhabditis indica Suryawanshi, 1971
