= Teratocephalidae =

Scientific classification
- Domain: Eukaryota
- Kingdom: Animalia
- Phylum: Nematoda
- Class: Chromadorea
- Order: Araeolaimida
- Family: Teratocephalidae

Family of nematodes

Teratocephalidae is a family of nematodes belonging to the order Araeolaimida.

Genera:

- Euteratocephalus Andrássy, 1958
- Teratocephalus de Man, 1876
