= Diplopeltidae =

Scientific classification
- Domain: Eukaryota
- Kingdom: Animalia
- Phylum: Nematoda
- Class: Chromadorea
- Order: Araeolaimida
- Superfamily: Axonolaimoidea
- Family: Diplopeltidae; Filipjev, 1918

Family of roundworms

Diplopeltidae is a family of roundworms in the class Adenophorea.

== Genera ==
There are two systems of classification of the genera of Diplopeltidae. The first divides the genera into subfamilies, while the other does not. The organisation of Diplopeltidae by subfamilies:

- Cylindrolaiminae
  - Cylindrolaimus de Man, 1880
- Diplopeltinae Filipjev, 1918
  - Araeolaimus de Man, 1888
  - Campylaimus Cobb, 1920
  - Diplopeltis Cobb, 1905
  - Diplopeltula Gerlach, 1950
  - Metaraeolaimoides de Conninck, 1936
  - Morlaixia Vincx & Gourbault, 1988
  - Pararaeolaimus Timm, 1961
  - Pseudaraeolaimus Chitwood, 1951
  - Southerniella Allgén, 1932
  - Striatodora Timm, 1961
- Incertae subfamiliae
  - Intasia Tchesunov & Miljutina, 2008
  - Mudwigglus Leduc, 2013

The organisation of Diplopeltidae without subfamilies:

- Araeolaimus de Man, 1888
- Campylaimus Cobb, 1920
- Cylindrolaimus de Man, 1880
- Diplopeltula Gerlach, 1950
- Intasia Tchesunov & Miljutina, 2008
- Morlaixia Vincx & Gourbault, 1988
- Mudwigglus Leduc, 2013
- Pararaeolaimus Timm, 1961
- Southerniella Allgén, 1932
- Striatodora Timm, 1961
