= Daniconematidae =

Scientific classification
- Domain: Eukaryota
- Kingdom: Animalia
- Phylum: Nematoda
- Class: Chromadorea
- Order: Rhabditida
- Family: Daniconematidae

Family of roundworms

Daniconematidae is a family of nematodes belonging to the order Rhabditida.

Genera:

- Daniconema Moravec & Køie, 1987
- Mexiconema Moravec, Vidal & Salgado Maldonado, 1992
