= Xennellidae =

Scientific classification
- Kingdom: Animalia
- Phylum: Nematoda
- Class: Enoplea
- Order: Enoplida
- Family: Xennellidae de Coninck, 1965

Family of roundworms

Xennellidae (or Xenellidae) is a family of nematodes belonging to the order Enoplida.

Genera:

- Xennella Cobb, 1920
- Porocoma Cobb, 1920
