= Drilonematidae =

Scientific classification
- Domain: Eukaryota
- Kingdom: Animalia
- Phylum: Nematoda
- Class: Chromadorea
- Order: Rhabditida
- Suborder: Spirurida
- Family: Drilonematidae; Chitwood, 1950

Family of roundworms

Drilonemidae is a family of parasites that inhabit the coeloms of earthworms.

Drilonematidae is a family of nematodes in the order of Spirurida. They are parasitic to earthworms.

== Genera ==
Genera:

- Adieronema Timm, 1967
- Alaninema Théodoridès, 1957
- Araguanema Ivanova & Hope, 2004
- Iponematinae Spiridonov & Ivanova, 2005
