= Desmidocercidae =

Scientific classification
- Kingdom: Animalia
- Phylum: Nematoda
- Class: Chromadorea
- Order: Rhabditida
- Family: Desmidocercidae

Family of nematodes

Desmidocercidae is a family of nematodes belonging to the order Rhabditida.

Genera:

- Desmidocerca Skrjabin, 1916
- Desmidocercella Yorke & Maplestone, 1926
- Diomedenema Johnston & Mawson, 1952
- Skrjabinocercella Gushanskaya, 1953
