= Spiruridae =

Scientific classification
- Kingdom: Animalia
- Phylum: Nematoda
- Class: Chromadorea
- Order: Rhabditida
- Suborder: Spirurida
- Family: Spiruridae

Family of roundworms

Spiruridae is family of nematodes in the order Spirurida. An unidentified parasitic larval member of this family has been recorded in the marsh rice rat (Oryzomys palustris) in a salt marsh at Cedar Key, Florida, and also in fiddler crabs (Uca) there; it is perhaps a bird parasite that does not reach maturity in the rice rat.

== See also ==
- List of parasites of the marsh rice rat

== Literature cited ==
- Kinsella, J.M. 1988. Comparison of helminths of rice rats, Oryzomys palustris, from freshwater and saltwater marshes in Florida. Proceedings of the Helminthological Society of Washington 55(2):275–280.
