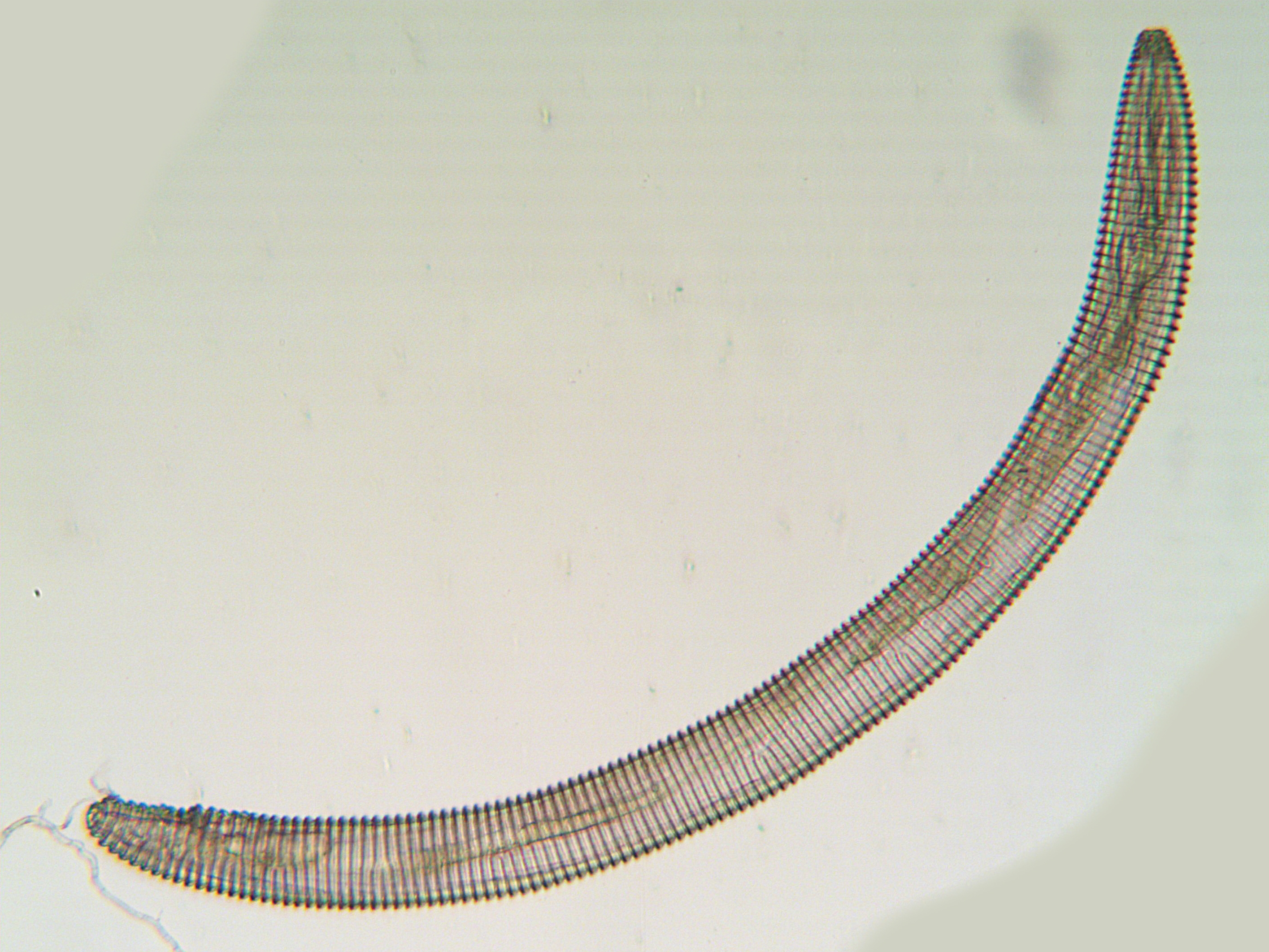
- Mesocriconema sp.

Scientific classification
- Kingdom: Animalia
- Phylum: Nematoda
- Class: Chromadorea
- Order: Rhabditida
- Suborder: Tylenchina
- Infraorder: Tylenchomorpha
- Superfamily: Criconematoidea
- Family: Criconematidae; Taylor, 1936

Synonyms
- Macropostoniidae; Madinematidae; Ogmidae

= Criconematidae =

Family of roundworms

Criconematidae is a family of nematodes belonging to the order Rhabditida.

== Genera ==
Genera:

- Amphisbaenema Orton Williams, 1982
- Bakernema Wu, 1964
- Blandicephalanema Mehta & Raski, 1971
- Mesocriconema Andrássy, 1965
