= Kalmanmolnaria =

Scientific classification
- Kingdom: Animalia
- Phylum: Nematoda
- Class: Chromadorea
- Order: Rhabditida
- Family: Skrjabillanidae
- Genus: Kalmanmolnaria; Sokolov, 2006
- Species: K. intestinalis

Binomial name
- Kalmanmolnaria intestinalis (Dogiel & Bychowsky, 1934) Sokolov, 2006

Synonyms
- Molnaria Moravec, 1968

Genus of roundworms

Kalmanmolnaria is a monotypic genus of nematodes belonging to the family Skrjabillanidae. The only species is Kalmanmolnaria intestinalis.
