= Rhigonematidae =

Scientific classification
- Kingdom: Animalia
- Phylum: Nematoda
- Class: Chromadorea
- Order: Rhabditida
- Superfamily: Rhigonematoidea
- Family: Rhigonematidae

Synonyms
- Ringonematidae

Family of nematodes

Rhigonematidae is a family of nematodes belonging to the order Oxyurida.

Genera:

- Dudekemia Artigas, 1930
- Glomerinema Van Waerebeke, 1985
- Obainia Adamson, 1983
- Rhigonema Cobb, 1898
