= Aulolaimidae =

Scientific classification
- Kingdom: Animalia
- Phylum: Nematoda
- Class: Chromadorea
- Order: Araeolaimida
- Family: Aulolaimidae

Family of roundworms

Aulolaimidae is a family of nematodes belonging to the order Araeolaimida.

Genera:

- Aegialoalaimus de Man, 1907
- Aulolaimus de Man, 1880
- Gymnolaimus
- Mehdilaimus Prabha, 1974
- Pseudoaulolaimus Imamura, 1931
