= Brevibuccidae =

Scientific classification
- Domain: Eukaryota
- Kingdom: Animalia
- Phylum: Nematoda
- Class: Chromadorea
- Order: Rhabditida
- Family: Brevibuccidae

Family of roundworms

Brevibuccidae is a family of nematodes belonging to the order Rhabditida.

Genera:

- Brevibucca Goodey, 1935
- Cuticonema Sanwal, 1959
- Tarantobelus Abolafia
