= Habronematidae =

Scientific classification
- Kingdom: Animalia
- Phylum: Nematoda
- Class: Chromadorea
- Order: Rhabditida
- Superfamily: Habronematoidea
- Family: Habronematidae; Ivaschkin, 1961

Genera
- See text

Family of roundworms

Habronematidae is a family of nematodes belonging to the order Rhabditida.

== Genera ==
- Cheilonematodum Johnston & Mawson, 1941
- Chitwoodspirura Chabaud & Rousselot, 1956
- Cyrnea Seurat, 1914
- Dollfusnema Caballero, 1974
- Draschia Chitwood & Wehr, 1934
- Echinurioides Thwaite, 1926
- Excisa Gendre, 1928
- Gendrespirura Chabaud, 1958
- Gubernaculomeres Oshmarin & Parukhin, 1963
- Habronema Diesing, 1861
- Hadjelia Seurat, 1916
- Histiocephalus Diesing, 1851
- Lispirurus Eberli, 2017
- Metacyrnea Chabaud, 1960
- Odontospirura Wehr, 1933
- Okapinema Ivaschkin, 1960
- Parabronema Baylis, 1921
- Procyrnea Chabaud, 1958
- Sicarius Li, 1934
- Stellocaronema Gilbert, 1930
- Torquatoides Williams, 1929
- Viguiera Seurat, 1913
