= Haliplectidae =

Scientific classification
- Domain: Eukaryota
- Kingdom: Animalia
- Phylum: Nematoda
- Class: Chromadorea
- Order: Araeolaimida
- Family: Haliplectidae

Family of roundworms

Haliplectidae is a family of nematodes belonging to the order Araeolaimida.

Genera:

- Geohaliplectus Siddiqi, 2012
- Haliplectus Cobb, 1913
- Longitubopharynx Allgén, 1959
- Setoplectus Vitiello, 1971
