= Isolaimiidae =

Scientific classification
- Domain: Eukaryota
- Kingdom: Animalia
- Phylum: Nematoda
- Class: Enoplea
- Order: Isolaimida
- Superfamily: Isolaimoidea
- Family: Isolaimiidae

Family of roundworms

Isolaimiidae is a family of nematodes belonging to the order Isolaimida.

Genera:

- Isolaimium Cobb, 1920
