= Prismatolaimidae =

Scientific classification
- Domain: Eukaryota
- Kingdom: Animalia
- Phylum: Nematoda
- Class: Enoplea
- Order: Enoplida
- Family: Prismatolaimidae

Family of roundworms

Prismatolaimidae is a family of nematodes belonging to the order Enoplida.

Genera:

- Cyathonchus Cobb, 1933
- Limonchulus Andrássy, 1963
- Odontolaimus Micoletzky, 1922
- Onchulus Cobb, 1920
- Paronchulus Altherr, 1972
- Prismatolaimus de Man, 1880
- Pseudonchulus
- Stenonchulus W.Schneider, 1940
