= Acanthocheilidae =

Scientific classification
- Domain: Eukaryota
- Kingdom: Animalia
- Phylum: Nematoda
- Class: Chromadorea
- Order: Rhabditida
- Family: Acanthocheilidae

Family of roundworms

Acanthocheilidae is a family of nematodes belonging to the order Rhabditida.

Genera:

- Acanthocheilus Molin, 1858
- Mawsonascaris Sprent, 1990
- Pseudanisakis Layman & Borovkova, 1926
