= Pneumospiruridae =

Scientific classification
- Domain: Eukaryota
- Kingdom: Animalia
- Phylum: Nematoda
- Class: Chromadorea
- Order: Rhabditida
- Family: Pneumospiruridae

Family of roundworms

Pneumospiruridae is a family of nematodes belonging to the order Rhabditida.

Genera:

- Metathelazia Skinker, 1931
- Pneumospirura Wu & Hu, 1938
- Vogeloides Orlov, Davtian & Lubimov, 1933
