= Diplotriaenidae =

Scientific classification
- Kingdom: Animalia
- Phylum: Nematoda
- Class: Chromadorea
- Order: Rhabditida
- Suborder: Spirurina
- Infraorder: Spiruromorpha
- Superfamily: Diplotriaenoidea; Anderson, 1958
- Family: Diplotriaenidae; Anderson, 1958

Genera
- Some 10, see text

Family of roundworms

Diplotriaenidae is a family of nematodes. Like all their relatives, they have neither a circulatory a or respiratory system. They are the only family in superfamily Diplotriaenoidea, if the Oswaldofilariidae are correctly placed with the Filarioidea and not here.

== Systematics ==
Subfamilies and genera of Diplotriaenidae are:

Subfamily Diplotriaeninae

- Chabaudiella
- Diplotriaena - includes Diplotriaenoides
- Quadriplotriaena

Subfamily Dicheilonematinae

- Dicheilonema - includes Contortospiculum
- Hamatospiculum - includes Parhamatospiculum, Tytofilaria, Oceanifilaria
- Hastospiculum - includes Setarospiculum
- Heterospiculum - includes Heterospiculoides
- Monopetalonema - includes Politospiculum and Ornithosetaria
- Petrovifilaria
- Serratospiculoides
- Serratospiculum
