= Tylenchina =

Scientific classification
- Kingdom: Animalia
- Phylum: Nematoda
- Class: Chromadorea
- Order: Rhabditida
- Suborder: Tylenchina; Chitwood, 1950

Suborder of nematodes

Tylenchina is a suborder of nematodes belonging to the order Tylenchida. The clade consists of two superfamilies: Tylenchoidea and Anguinoidea.
