= Chromadorina =

Scientific classification
- Kingdom: Animalia
- Phylum: Nematoda
- Class: Chromadorea
- Order: Chromadorida
- Family: Chromadoridae
- Subfamily: Chromadorinae
- Genus: Chromadorina; Filipjev, 1918

Type species
- Chromadorina obtusa Filipjev, 1918

Synonyms
- Heterochromadora Wieser, 1951

Genus of roundworms

Chromadorina is a genus of nematodes belonging to the family Chromadoridae.

The genus was first described by Filipjev.

The species of this genus are found in Europe and America.

Species:

- Chromadorina affinis Long & Gagarin & Tu, 2022
- Chromadorina armata (Allgén, 1933) Wieser, 1954
- Chromadorina astacicola (Schneider, 1932) Wieser, 1954
- Chromadorina bercziki Andrássy, 1962
- Chromadorina bergensis (Allgén, 1932) Wieser, 1954
- Chromadorina bioculata (Schultze in Carus, 1857) Wieser, 1954
- Chromadorina cervix (Wieser, 1951) Wieser, 1954
- Chromadorina communis Guo, Wang, Li & Wang, 2023
- Chromadorina demani Inglis, 1962
- Chromadorina epidemos Hopper & Meyers, 1967
- Chromadorina erythrophthalma (G. Schneider, 1906) Wieser, 1954
- Chromadorina germanica (Bütschli, 1874) Wieser, 1954
- Chromadorina granulopigmentata (Wieser, 1951) Wieser, 1954
- Chromadorina hiromii Kito & Nakamura, 2001
- Chromadorina incurvata Wieser, 1956
- Chromadorina inversa Wieser, 1955
- Chromadorina longisetosa (De Coninck & Schuurmans Stekhoven, 1933) Wieser, 1954
- Chromadorina longispiculum Pastor de Ward, 1985
- Chromadorina macropunctata (Wieser, 1954) Wieser, 1954
- Chromadorina majae Wieser, 1968
- Chromadorina metulata Aissa & Vitiello, 1977
- Chromadorina micoletzkyi Inglis, 1962
- Chromadorina nuda Wieser, 1954
- Chromadorina obtusa Filipjev, 1918
- Chromadorina paradoxa Timm, 1961
- Chromadorina rognoeensis (Allgén, 1932) Wieser, 1954
- Chromadorina salina Belogurov, 1978
- Chromadorina supralitoralis Lorenzen, 1969
- Chromadorina tangaroa Leduc, 2020
- Chromadorina viridis (Linstow, 1876) Wieser, 1954
