= Cryptonchidae =

Scientific classification
- Domain: Eukaryota
- Kingdom: Animalia
- Phylum: Nematoda
- Class: Enoplea
- Order: Enoplida
- Family: Cryptonchidae

Family of roundworms

Cryptonchidae is a family of nematodes belonging to the order Enoplida.

Genera:

- Cryptonchus Cobb, 1913
