= Alloionematidae =

Scientific classification
- Domain: Eukaryota
- Kingdom: Animalia
- Phylum: Nematoda
- Class: Chromadorea
- Order: Rhabditida
- Family: Alloionematidae

Family of worms

Alloionematidae is a family of nematodes belonging to the order Rhabditida.

Genera:

- Alloionema Schneider, 1859
- Cheilobus Cobb, 1924
- Leptodera Dujardin, 1845
