= Hartertiidae =

Scientific classification
- Domain: Eukaryota
- Kingdom: Animalia
- Phylum: Nematoda
- Class: Chromadorea
- Order: Rhabditida
- Family: Hartertiidae

Family of nematodes

Hartertiidae is a family of nematodes belonging to the order Rhabditida.

Genera:

- Alainchabaudia Mawson, 1968
- Hartertia Seurat, 1914
