= Micropleuridae =

Scientific classification
- Domain: Eukaryota
- Kingdom: Animalia
- Phylum: Nematoda
- Class: Chromadorea
- Order: Rhabditida
- Family: Micropleuridae

Family of roundworms

Micropleuridae is a family of nematodes belonging to the order Rhabditida.

Genera:

- Granulinema Moravec & Little, 1988
- Kamegainema Hasegawa, Doi, Araki & Miyata, 2000
- Micropleura Linstow, 1906
- Philonema
- Protenema Petter & Planelles, 1986
