= Oxystominidae =

Scientific classification
- Kingdom: Animalia
- Phylum: Nematoda
- Class: Enoplea
- Order: Enoplida
- Family: Oxystominidae; Filipjev, 1918

Synonyms
- Paroxystominidae

Family of nematodes

Oxystominidae is a family of nematodes belonging to the order Enoplida.

== Genera ==
Genera:

- Angustinema Cobb, 1933
- Cricohalalaimus Bussau
- Halalaimus de Man, 1888
