= Bodonematidae =

Scientific classification
- Domain: Eukaryota
- Kingdom: Animalia
- Phylum: Nematoda
- Class: Chromadorea
- Order: Araeolaimida
- Family: Bodonematidae; Jensen, 1991

Family of roundworms

Bodonematidae is a family of nematodes belonging to the order Araeolaimida.

Genera:

- Bodonema Jensen, 1991
