= Cobbonchidae =

Scientific classification
- Domain: Eukaryota
- Kingdom: Animalia
- Phylum: Nematoda
- Class: Enoplea
- Order: Dorylaimida
- Family: Cobbonchidae

Family of roundworms

Cobbonchidae is a family of nematodes belonging to the order Dorylaimida.

Genera:

- Cobbonchulus Andrássy, 2009
- Cobbonchus Andrássy, 1958
