= Quimperiidae =

Scientific classification
- Kingdom: Animalia
- Phylum: Nematoda
- Class: Chromadorea
- Order: Rhabditida
- Suborder: Spirurina
- Infraorder: Ascaridomorpha
- Superfamily: Seuratoidea
- Family: Quimperiidae; Gendre, 1928

Family of roundworms

Quimperiidae is a family of nematodes belonging to the order Rhabditida.

== Genera ==
Genera:

- Buckleynema Ali & Singh, 1954
- Desmognathinema Baker, Goater & Esch, 1987
- Ezonema Boyce, 1971
- Gendria Baylis, 1930
- Gibsonnema Moravec, Salgado Maldonado & Aguilar Aguilar, 2002
- Haplodidentus Naidu & Thakare, 1981
- Haplonema Ward & Magath, 1917
- Ichthyobronema Gnedina & Savina, 1930
- Neoomeia Yin & Zhang, 1984
- Neoparaseuratum Moravec, Kohn & Fernandes, 1992
- Omeia Hsu, 1933
- Paragendria Baylis, 1939
- Paraquimperia Baylis, 1934
- Paraseuratoides Moravec, Salgado-Maldonado & Aguilar-Aguilar, 2002
- Paraseuratum Johnston & Mawson, 1940
- Pingus Hsu, 1933
- Quimperia Gendre, 1928
- Subulascaris Freitas & Dobbin, 1957
- Touzeta Petter, 1987
