= Aponchiidae =

Scientific classification
- Domain: Eukaryota
- Kingdom: Animalia
- Phylum: Nematoda
- Class: Chromadorea
- Order: Monhysterida
- Family: Aponchiidae

Family of roundworms

Aponchiidae is a family of nematodes belonging to the order Monhysterida.

Genera:

- Aponchium Cobb, 1920
- Metalaimoides
- Synonema Cobb, 1920
