= Homungellidae =

Scientific classification
- Domain: Eukaryota
- Kingdom: Animalia
- Phylum: Nematoda
- Class: Chromadorea
- Order: Rhabditida
- Family: Homungellidae

Family of nematodes

Homungellidae is a family of nematodes belonging to the order Rhabditida.

Genera:

- Homungella Timm, 1966
