= Rhabdochonidae =

Scientific classification
- Domain: Eukaryota
- Kingdom: Animalia
- Phylum: Nematoda
- Class: Chromadorea
- Order: Rhabditida
- Family: Rhabdochonidae

Family of spirurian roundworms

Rhabdochonidae is a family of nematodes belonging to the order Rhabditida.

== Genera ==
Genera:

- Beaninema Caspeta-Mandujano, Moravec & Salgado-Maldonado, 2001
- Fellicola Petter & Køie, 1993
- Freitasia Barus & Coy Otero, 1968
- Hepatinema Rasheed, 1964
- Heptochona Rasheed, 1965
- Johnstonmawsonia Campana-Rouget, 1955
- Johnstonmawsonoides Machida, 1975
- Megachona Mejía-Madrid & Pérez-Ponce de León, 2007
- Pancreatonema McVicar & Gibson, 1975
- Rhabdochoinoides Rahemo & Kasim, 1979
- Rhabdochona Railliet, 1916
- Skrjabinitectus Majumdar & Banerjee, 1966
- Trichospirura Smith & Chitwood, 1967
- Vasorhabdochona Martin & Zam, 1967
