= Ungellidae =

Scientific classification
- Kingdom: Animalia
- Phylum: Nematoda
- Class: Chromadorea
- Order: Rhabditida
- Family: Ungellidae

Family of roundworms

Ungellidae is a family of nematodes belonging to the order Rhabditida.

== Genera ==
Genera:

- Acanthungella Ivanova & Hope, 2004
- Adungella Timm, 1967
- Chabaudigella Ivanova & Bain, 2012
- Drasico
