= Mononchulidae =

Scientific classification
- Domain: Eukaryota
- Kingdom: Animalia
- Phylum: Nematoda
- Class: Enoplea
- Order: Dorylaimida
- Family: Mononchulidae

Family of roundworms

Mononchulidae is a family of nematodes belonging to the order Dorylaimida.

Genera:

- Mononchulus Cobb, 1918
- Oionchus Cobb, 1913
- Rahmium Andrássy, 1973
