= Carabonematidae =

Scientific classification
- Domain: Eukaryota
- Kingdom: Animalia
- Phylum: Nematoda
- Class: Chromadorea
- Order: Rhabditida
- Family: Carabonematidae

Family of roundworms

Carabonematidae is a family of nematodes belonging to the order Rhabditida.

Genera:

- Carabonema Stammer & Wachek, 1952
