= Chambersiellidae =

Scientific classification
- Kingdom: Animalia
- Phylum: Nematoda
- Class: Chromadorea
- Order: Rhabditida
- Family: Chambersiellidae

Family of roundworms

Chambersiellidae is a family of nematodes belonging to the order Rhabditida.

Genera:

- Chambersiella Cobb, 1920
- Cornilaimus Truskova & Eroshenko, 1977
- Diastolaimus Rahm, 1928
- Geraldius Sanwal, 1971
