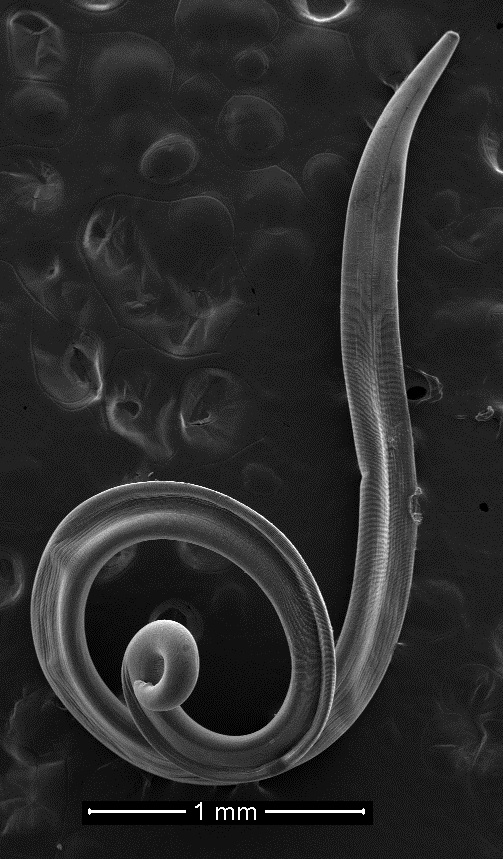
- Male Thelazia callipaeda

Scientific classification
- Kingdom: Animalia
- Phylum: Nematoda
- Class: Chromadorea
- Order: Rhabditida
- Superfamily: Thelazioidea
- Family: Thelaziidae; Skrjabin, 1915

Genera
- About 7, see text

= Thelaziidae =

Family of roundworms

Thelaziidae is a family of spirurian nematodes, which form the mid-sized lineage of the superfamily Thelazioidea. Like all nematodes, they have neither a circulatory nor a respiratory system.

They number seven genera or so, with a few dozen species all together. Mostly parasites of birds, a few have also been found in other vertebrates.

== Systematics ==
The subfamily Oxyspirurinae is monotypic, as are several little-known genera in the Thelaziinae; these all might not be valid. All together, the systematic layout of this family is liable to change and cannot be considered more than tentative.

Subfamily Oxyspirurinae Skrjabin, 1916

- Oxyspirura Dräsche in Stossich, 1897

Subfamily Thelaziinae Skrjabin, 1915

- Ceratospira Schneider, 1866
- Hempelia Vaz, 1937
- Pancreatonema McVicar & Gibson, 1975
- Pericyema Railliet, 1925
- Thelazia Bosc in Blainville, 1819
- Thylaconema Chandler, 1929
