= Coninckiidae =

Scientific classification
- Domain: Eukaryota
- Kingdom: Animalia
- Phylum: Nematoda
- Class: Chromadorea
- Order: Araeolaimida
- Family: Coninckiidae; Lorenzen, 1981

Family of nematodes

Coninckiidae is a family of nematodes belonging to the order Araeolaimida.

Genera:

- Coninckia Gerlach, 1956
