= Neodiplogasteridae =

Scientific classification
- Domain: Eukaryota
- Kingdom: Animalia
- Phylum: Nematoda
- Class: Chromadorea
- Order: Diplogasterida
- Family: Neodiplogasteridae

Family of roundworms

Neodiplogasteridae is a family of nematodes belonging to the order Diplogasterida.

Genera:

- Diplenteron
