= Araeolaimidae =

Scientific classification
- Domain: Eukaryota
- Kingdom: Animalia
- Phylum: Nematoda
- Class: Chromadorea
- Order: Araeolaimida
- Family: Araeolaimidae; De Coninck, 1965

Genera
- Araeolaimus de Man, 1888

Family of roundworms

Araeolaimidae is a family of marine free living nematodes.
