= Pterygorhabditidae =

Scientific classification
- Domain: Eukaryota
- Kingdom: Animalia
- Phylum: Nematoda
- Class: Chromadorea
- Order: Rhabditida
- Family: Pterygorhabditidae

Family of nematodes

Pterygorhabditidae is a family of nematodes belonging to the order Rhabditida.

Genera:

- Pterygorhabditis Timm, 1957
- Pterygorhitis Andrássy, 2005
