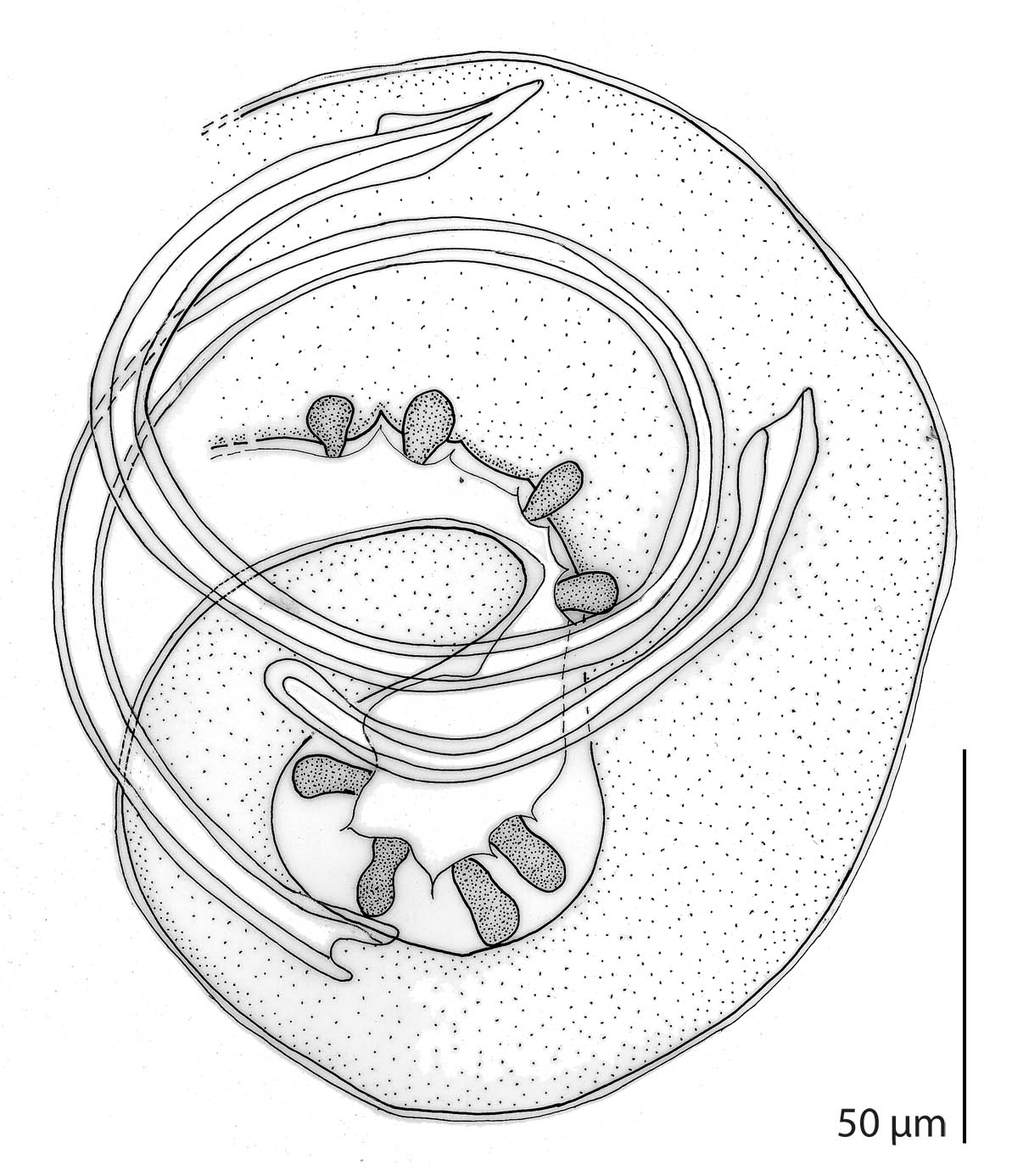
- Moravecnema segonzaci (Cystidicolidae)

Scientific classification
- Kingdom: Animalia
- Phylum: Nematoda
- Class: Chromadorea
- Order: Rhabditida
- Infraorder: Spiruromorpha
- Superfamily: Habronematoidea; Ivaschkin, 1961

Families
- Cystidicolidae Skrjabin, 1946; Habronematidae Ivaschkin, 1961; Hedruridae Railliet, 1916; Tetrameridae Travassos, 1914

= Habronematoidea =

Superfamily of roundworms

Habronematoidea is a superfamily of spirurian nematodes in the large order Spirurida. Like all nematodes, they have neither a circulatory nor a respiratory system.

Though none of the families placed here are overly diverse, they are quite large except for the monotypic Hedruridae. Consequently, the Habronematoidea are at present the second-largest superfamily of Spirurida, after the Filarioidea which contains the massively speciose Onchocercidae.

The families of the Habronematoidea are:

- Cystidicolidae
- Habronematidae
- Hedruridae
- Tetrameridae
