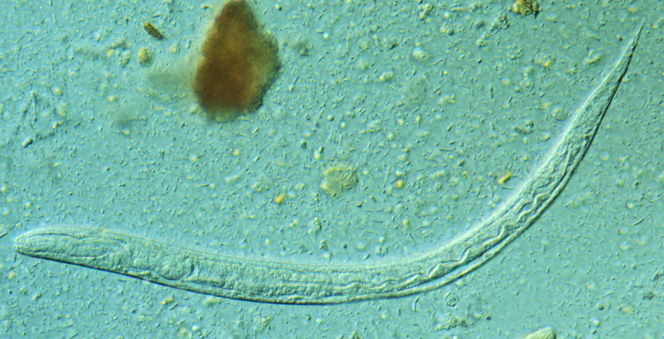
- Larva of Strongyloides stercoralis

Scientific classification
- Kingdom: Animalia
- Phylum: Nematoda
- Class: Chromadorea
- Order: Rhabditida
- Family: Strongyloididae

= Strongyloididae =

Family of nematodes

Strongyloididae is a family of nematodes belonging to the order Rhabditida.

Genera:

- Leipernema Narayan Singh, 1976
- Parastrongyloides Morgan, 1928
- Strongyloides Grassi, 1879
