= Mononchidae =

Scientific classification
- Kingdom: Animalia
- Phylum: Nematoda
- Class: Enoplea
- Order: Dorylaimida
- Family: Mononchidae

Family of roundworms

Mononchidae is a family of nematodes in the order Dorylaimida.

== Genera ==
Genera:

- Actus Baqri & Jairajpuri, 1973
- Brachonchulus
- Caputonchus Siddiqi, 1984
