= Odontopharyngidae =

Scientific classification
- Domain: Eukaryota
- Kingdom: Animalia
- Phylum: Nematoda
- Class: Chromadorea
- Order: Diplogasterida
- Family: Odontopharyngidae

Family of nematodes

Odontopharyngidae is a family of nematodes belonging to the order Diplogasterida.

Genera:

- Odontopharynx
