= Diplogasteroididae =

Scientific classification
- Domain: Eukaryota
- Kingdom: Animalia
- Phylum: Nematoda
- Class: Chromadorea
- Order: Diplogasterida
- Family: Diplogasteroididae

Family of roundworms

Diplogasteroididae is a family of nematodes belonging to the order Diplogasterida.

Genera:

- Dirhabdilaimus
