= Myolaimidae =

Scientific classification
- Kingdom: Animalia
- Phylum: Nematoda
- Class: Chromadorea
- Order: Rhabditida
- Suborder: Myolaimina; Inglis, 1983
- Superfamily: Myolaimoidea; Andrássy, 1958
- Family: Myolaimidae; Andrássy, 1958

Genera
- Deleyia; Myolaimus

Family of roundworms

Myolaimidae is a family of nematodes in the order Rhabditida. It consists of two genera, Myolaimus and Deleyia.

== Genera and species ==
Deleyia Holovachov & Boström, 2006

Two species are recognized:

- Deleyia aspiculata Holovachov & Boström, 2006
- Deleyia poinari Holovachov & Boström, 2006

Myolaimus Cobb, 1920

16 species are recognized:

- Myolaimus amititiae Andrássy, 1959
- Myolaimus byersi Giblin-Davis, Kanzaki, de Ley, Williams, Schierenberg, Ragsdale, Zeng & Center, 2010
- Myolaimus cotopaxus Bärmann, Fürst von Lieven & Sudhaus, 2009
- Myolaimus dendrodipnis Paesler, 1956
- Myolaimus goodeyorum Andrássy, 1984
- Myolaimus hermaphrodita Bärmann, Fürst von Lieven & Sudhaus, 2009
- Myolaimus heterurus Cobb, 1920
- Myolaimus hortulanus Bärmann, Fürst von Lieven & Sudhaus, 2009
- Myolaimus ibericus Abolafia & Pena-Santiago, 2016
- Myolaimus indicus Ali, Farooqui & Suryawanshi, 1970
- Myolaimus maupasi (Sanwal, 1960)
- Myolaimus mycophilus Slos & Bert in Slos, Couvreur & Bert, 2018
- Myolaimus rahmi Sudhaus, 1977
- Myolaimus stammeri Hirschmann, 1952
- Myolaimus tepidus Andrássy, 2005
- Myolaimus xylophilus Bärmann, Fürst von Lieven & Sudhaus, 2009
