= Neotylenchidae =

Scientific classification
- Kingdom: Animalia
- Phylum: Nematoda
- Class: Secernentea
- Order: Tylenchida
- Family: Neotylenchidae

Synonyms
- Phaenopsitylenchidae

Family of nematodes

Neotylenchidae is a family of nematodes belonging to the order Tylenchida.

== Genera ==
Genera:

- Abursanema Yaghoubi, Pourjam, Pedram, Siddiqi & Atighi, 2014
- Anguillonema Fuchs, 1938
- Boleodorus Thorne, 1941
