= Linhomoeidae =

Scientific classification
- Kingdom: Animalia
- Phylum: Nematoda
- Class: Chromadorea
- Order: Monhysterida
- Family: Linhomoeidae

Family of roundworms

Linhomoeidae is a family of nematodes belonging to the order Monhysterida.

== Genera ==
Genera:

- Allgenia
- Anticyathus Cobb, 1920
- Anticyclus Cobb, 1920
