= Ceramonematidae =

Scientific classification
- Domain: Eukaryota
- Kingdom: Animalia
- Phylum: Nematoda
- Class: Chromadorea
- Order: Desmodorida
- Family: Ceramonematidae

Synonyms
- Dasynemellidae

Family of nematodes

Ceramonematidae is a family of nematodes belonging to the order Desmodorida.

Genera:

- Ceramonema Cobb, 1920
- Dasynemella Cobb, 1933
- Dasynemoides Chitwood, 1936
- Metadasynemella De Coninck, 1942
- Metadasynemoides Haspeslagh, 1973
- Pristionema Cobb, 1933
- Pselionema Cobb, 1933
- Pterygonema Gerlach, 1953
