= Cylindrocorporidae =

Scientific classification
- Kingdom: Animalia
- Phylum: Nematoda
- Class: Chromadorea
- Order: Diplogasterida
- Family: Cylindrocorporidae

Family of roundworms

Cylindrocorporidae is a family of nematodes belonging to the order Diplogasterida. Members of this family are either parasitic to frogs or bats.

== Genera ==
Genera:

- Cylindrocorpus
- Goodeyus
- Longibucca
