= Selachinematidae =

Scientific classification
- Domain: Eukaryota
- Kingdom: Animalia
- Phylum: Nematoda
- Class: Chromadorea
- Order: Desmodorida
- Family: Selachinematidae

Family of nematodes

Selachinematidae is a family of nematodes belonging to the order Desmodorida.

Genera:

- Bendiella Leduc, 2013
- Cheironchus Cobb, 1917
- Demonema Cobb, 1894
- Desmotersia Neira & Decraemer, 2009
- Kosswigonema Gerlach, 1964
- Pseudocheironchus Leduc, 2013
- Synonchiella Cobb, 1933
- Synonchium Cobb, 1920
- Trogolaimus
