= Cyatholaimidae =

Scientific classification
- Domain: Eukaryota
- Kingdom: Animalia
- Phylum: Nematoda
- Class: Chromadorea
- Order: Desmodorida
- Family: Cyatholaimidae

Family of nematodes

Cyatholaimidae is a family of nematodes belonging to the order Desmodorida. The family contains 20 genera most of which are found in marine environments.

== Taxonomy ==
The following genera are a part of Cyatholaimidae:

- Acanthonchus Cobb, 1920
- Biarmifer Wieser, 1954
- Craspodema Gerlach, 1956
- Cyatholaimus Bastian, 1865
- Cyathoshiva Datta, Miljutin, Chakraborty and Mohapatra, 2016
- Dispira Cobb, 1933
- Isacanthonchus Gagarin and Nguyen Vu Thanh, 2008
- Longicyatholaimus Micoletzky, 1924
- Marylynnia Hopper, 1972
- Metacyatholaimus Schuurmans Stekhoven, 1942
- Nannolaimoides Ott, 1972
- Paracanthonchus Micoletzky, 1924
- Paracyatholaimoides Gerlach, 1953
- Paracyatholaimus Micoletzky, 1922
- Paralongicyatholaimus Schuurmans Stekhoven, 1950
- Paramarylynnia Huang and Zhang, 2007
- Phyllolaimus Murphy, 1963
- Pomponema Cobb, 1917
- Praeacanthonchus Micoletzky, 1924
- Xenocyatholaimus Gerlach, 1953
- Xyzzors Inglis, 1963
