= Sphaerolaimidae =

Scientific classification
- Domain: Eukaryota
- Kingdom: Animalia
- Phylum: Nematoda
- Class: Chromadorea
- Order: Monhysterida
- Family: Sphaerolaimidae

Family of nematodes

Sphaerolaimidae is a family of nematodes belonging to the order Monhysterida.

Genera:

- Buccolaimus Allgén, 1959
- Doliolaimus Lorenzen, 1966
- Hofmaenneria W.Schneider, 1940
- Metasphaerolaimus Gourbault & Boucher, 1981
- Parasphaerolaimus Ditlevsen, 1918
- Sphaerolaimus Bastian, 1865
- Subsphaerolaimus Lorenzen, 1978
