= Bunonematidae =

Scientific classification
- Kingdom: Animalia
- Phylum: Nematoda
- Class: Chromadorea
- Order: Rhabditida
- Family: Bunonematidae; Micoletzky, 1922

Genera
- Aspidonema; Bunonema; Craspedonema; Rhodolaimus; Sachisium; Serronema; Stammeria

Synonyms
- Bunonemidae

Family of roundworms

Bunonematidae is a family of nematodes in the order Rhabditida.
