= Axonolaimidae =

Scientific classification
- Domain: Eukaryota
- Kingdom: Animalia
- Phylum: Nematoda
- Class: Chromadorea
- Order: Araeolaimida
- Family: Axonolaimidae; Filipjev, 1918

Family of roundworms

Axonolaimidae is a family of marine nematodes belonging to the order Araeolaimida.

== Genera ==
Genera:

- Aequalodontium Smolyanko & Belogurov, 1993
- Alaimonema
- Anplostoma
