= Monhysterida =

Scientific classification
- Domain: Eukaryota
- Kingdom: Animalia
- Phylum: Nematoda
- Class: Chromadorea
- Subclass: Chromadoria
- Order: Monhysterida

Families
- Aponchiidae; Linhomoeidae; Monhysteridae; Scaptrellidae; Siphonolaimidae; Sphaerolaimidae; Xyalidae; incertae sedis

Order of roundworms

The Monhysterida are an order in the phylum Nematoda. Usually the stoma in Monhysterida is funnel shaped and lightly cuticularized, but it is sometimes spacious and heavily cuticularized and they always have protrusible teeth. They are either simply spiral or circular. This worm is marine.
