= Enoplia =

Scientific classification
- Domain: Eukaryota
- Kingdom: Animalia
- Phylum: Nematoda
- Class: Enoplea
- Subclass: Enoplia; Pearse, 1942

Orders
- Enoplida; Trefusiida; Triplonchida

Subclass of roundworms

The Enoplia are a subclass of nematodes in the class Enoplea.

== Description ==
Enoplians are characterized by amphids shaped like ovals, stirrups, or pouches. Their bodies are smooth, without rings or lines. The esophagus is cylindrical and glandular.

== Taxonomy ==
Lorenzen described two orders, Enoplida and Trefusiida, in the 1980s based on morphology. With the advent of phylogenetic analysis, a reorganisation has been necessary, moving the Triplonchida here to create three orders and expanding it.

The orders are distinguished mainly by habitat type.

- Enoplida Filipjev, 1929 – nematodes of marine and brackish water habitat, carnivorous or feed on diatoms and other algaes
- Triplonchida Cobb, 1920 – terrestrial nematodes, including some plant parasites
- Trefusiida Lorenzen, 1981

== Phylogeny ==
Enoplia is regarded as the earliest nematode branch, according to recent phylogenetic analysis. Enoplia is mentioned as a sister clade to Dorylaima and Chromadoria.

== Bibliography ==
- Blaxter, Mark L.; De Ley, Paul; Garey, James R.; Liu, Leo X.; Scheldeman, Patsy; Vierstraete, Andy; Vanfleteren, Jacques R.; Mackey, Laura Y.; Dorris, Mark; Frisse, Linda M.; Vida, J. T.; Thomas, W. Kelley (5 March 1998). "A molecular evolutionary framework for the phylum Nematoda". Nature. 392 (6671): 71–75. Bibcode:1998Natur.392...71B. doi:10.1038/32160. PMID 9510248. S2CID 4301939.
- Lee, Donald L, ed. (2010). The biology of nematodes. London: Taylor & Francis. ISBN 978-0415272117.
- De Ley, P & Blaxter, M 2004, 'A new system for Nematoda: combining morphological characters with molecular trees, and translating clades into ranks and taxa'. in R Cook & DJ Hunt (eds), Nematology Monographs and Perspectives. vol. 2, E.J. Brill, Leiden, pp. 633–653.
