= Pharyngodonidae =

Scientific classification
- Kingdom: Animalia
- Phylum: Nematoda
- Class: Chromadorea
- Order: Rhabditida
- Suborder: Spirurina
- Infraorder: Oxyuridomorpha
- Superfamily: Oxyuroidea
- Family: Pharyngodonidae; Travassos, 1919

Family of nematodes

Pharyngodonidae is a family of nematodes belonging to the order Rhabditida. Members of this family are primarily intestinal parasites that infect reptiles, amphibians, and occasionally other vertebrates. They are generally small in size and complete their life cycle within the digestive tract of their hosts. Transmission usually occurs through the ingestion of eggs passed in feces, allowing the parasites to spread in the host’s environment. The family includes several genera such as Pharyngodon, Spauligodon, and Thelandros, many of which are important for understanding host–parasite relationships in herpetofauna. While infections are often mild, heavy infestations can lead to health problems in the host.

== Genera ==
Genera:

- Alaeuris Tharpar, 1925
- Ataronema Hasegawa, 2005
- Batracholandros Freitas & Ibáñez, 1965
- Gyrinicola Yamaguti, 1938
- Parapharyngodon Chatterji, 1933
