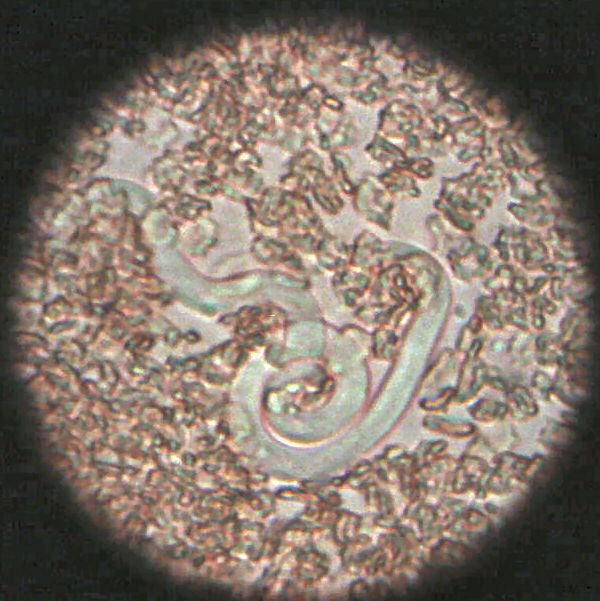
- Dirofilaria immitis larva Magnification 400×

Scientific classification
- Kingdom: Animalia
- Phylum: Nematoda
- Class: Chromadorea
- Order: Rhabditida
- Suborder: Spirurida

Superfamilies
- 10, but see text

= Spirurida =

Order of roundworms

Spirurida falls under the phylum Nematoda class Chromadorea and order Rhabditida. They are characterized by their elongated, cylindrical bodies and unsegmented structure. Like all nematodes, they have neither a circulatory nor a respiratory system.

Some Spirurida, like the genus Gongylonema, can cause disease in humans. One such disease is a skin infection with Spirurida larvae, called "creeping disease". Some species are known as eyeworms and infect the orbital cavity of animal hosts.

== Systematics ==
The Camallanida are sometimes included herein as a suborder, and the Drilonematida are sometimes placed here as a superfamily. There are doubts about the internal systematics of the Spirurida, and some groups placed herein might belong to other spirurian or even secernentean lineages.

The following superfamilies are at least provisionally placed in the Spirurida:

- Acuarioidea
- Aproctoidea
- Diplotriaenoidea
- Filarioidea
- Gnathostomatoidea
- Habronematoidea
- Physalopteroidea
- Rictularioidea
- Spiruroidea
- Thelazioidea
