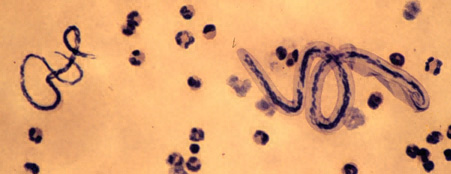
- Microfilariae of Mansonella perstans (left) and Loa loa (Spirurina: Filariidae)

Scientific classification
- Kingdom: Animalia
- Phylum: Nematoda
- Class: Chromadorea
- Order: Rhabditida
- Suborder: Spirurina; Railliet & Henry, 1915

Infraorders
- See text

Synonyms
- Camallanina

= Spirurina =

Suborder of roundworms

Spirurina is a suborder of nematode worms in the order Rhabditida. Spirurina contains a diverse group of worms that inhabit soil, water, and other bodies of organism.

== Infraorders ==
Spirurina contains the following infraorders, based on the World Nematode Database:

=== Ascaridomorpha De Ley & Blaxter, 2002 ===
Ascaridomorpha contains the following superfamilies:

- Ascaridoidea Baird, 1853
- Cosmocercoidea Railliet, 1916
- Heterakoidea Railliet & Henry, 1912
- Seuratoidea Hall, 1916
- Subuluroidea Yorke & Maplestone, 1926

=== Gnathostomatomorpha De Ley & Blaxter, 2002 ===
Gnathostomatomorpha contains the following superfamilies:

- Gnathostomatoidea Railliet, 1895

=== Oxyuridomorpha De Ley & Blaxter, 2002 ===
Oxyuridomorpha, which was previously the order Oxyurida, contains the following superfamilies:

- Oxyuroidea Weinland, 1858
- Thelastomatoidea Travassos, 1929

=== Rhigonematomorpha De Ley & Blaxter, 2002 ===
Rhigonematomorpha contains the following superfamilies:

- Ransomnematoidea Travassos, 1930
- Rhigonematoidea Artigas, 1930

=== Spiruromorpha De Ley & Blaxter, 2002 ===
Members of Spiruromorpha are known to parasitize porpoises, canids, pangolins, various other mammals, newts, along with fish such as catfish, sturgeons, suckers, salmonids, and pikes. It contains the following superfamilies:

- Acuarioidea Railliet, Henry & Sisoff, 1912
- Aproctoidea Skrjabin & Shikhobalova, 1945
- Camallanoidea Travassos, 1920
- Diplotriaenoidea Anderson, 1958
- Filarioidea Chabaud & Anderson, 1959
- Habronematoidea Ivaschkin, 1961
- Physalopteroidea Railliet, 1893
- Rictularoidea Railliet, 1916
- Spiruroidea Oerley, 1885
- Thelazioidea Skrjabin, 1915
