= Araeolaimida =

Scientific classification
- Domain: Eukaryota
- Kingdom: Animalia
- Phylum: Nematoda
- Class: Chromadorea
- Subclass: Chromadoria
- Order: Araeolaimida; De Coninck & Schuurmans Stekhoven, 1933

Families
- Araeolaimidae; Axonolaimidae; Bodonematidae; Comesomatidae; Coninckiidae; Diplopeltidae

Order of roundworms

Araeolaimida is an order of marine free living nematodes.
