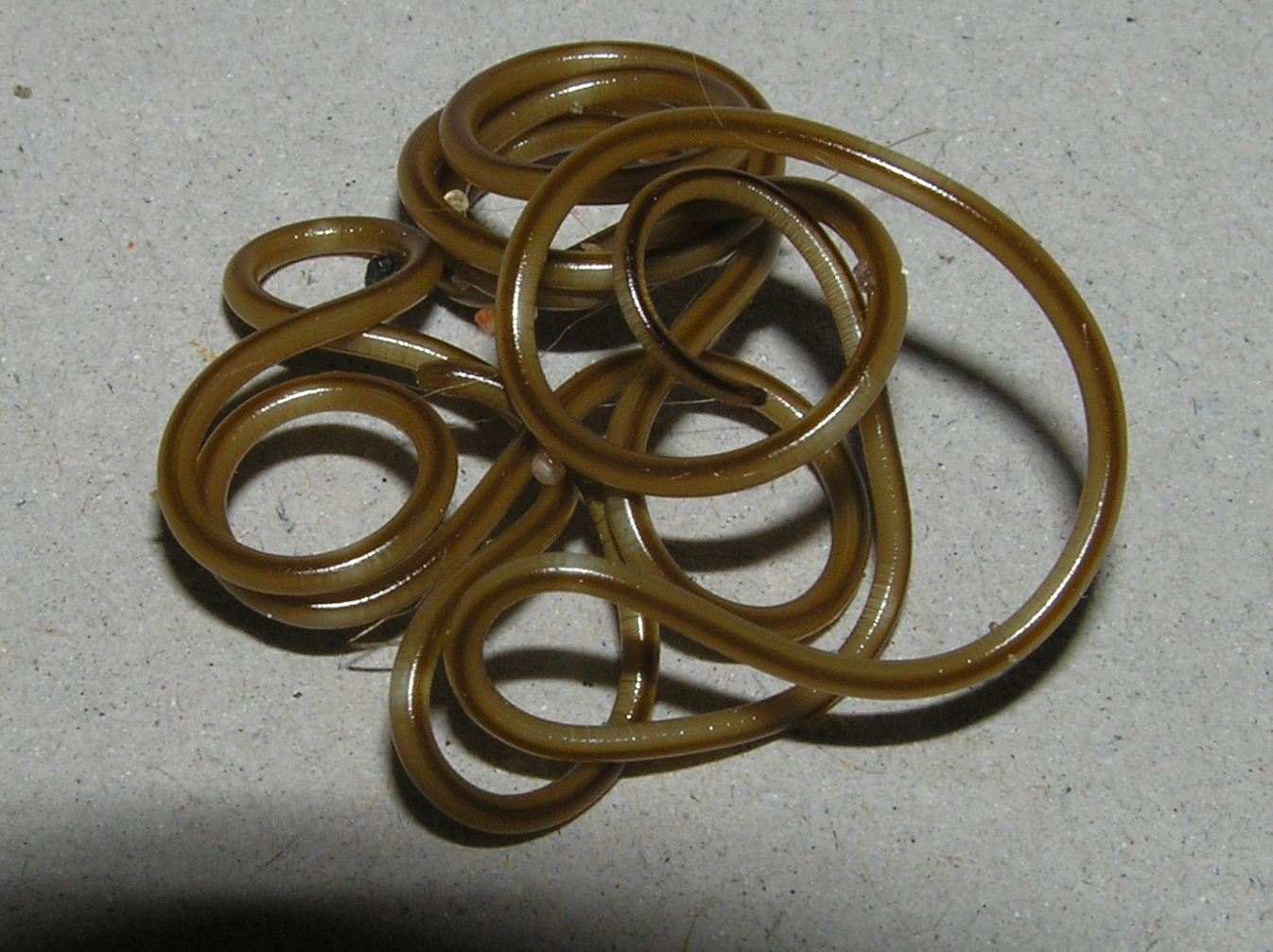
- Mermis nigrescens

Scientific classification
- Kingdom: Animalia
- Phylum: Nematoda
- Class: Enoplea; Inglis, 1983

Subclasses
- Dorylaimia; Enoplia

= Enoplea =

Class of roundworms

Enoplea (enopleans) is a class within the phylum Nematoda.

== Description ==
The Enoplea are distinguished from the Chromadorea by a number of characteristics. The enoplean esophagus is cylindrical or "bottle-shaped", compared to the bulbous chromadorean esophagus. Enopleans have pocket-like amphids, while chromadoreans have amphids shaped like slits, pores, coils, or spirals. An enoplean is smooth or marked with fine lines, while a chromadorean may have rings, projections, or setae. The enoplean excretory system is simple, sometimes made up of a single cell, while chromadoreans have more complex, tubular systems, sometimes with glands.

== Taxonomy ==
Phylogenetic analysis of phylum Nematoda suggests three distinct basal clades, the dorylaims, enoplids and chromadorids. These represent Clades I, II and C+S of Blaxter (1998). Of these, the first two appear to have sister clade status, allowing resolution into two classes, Enoplea and Chromadorea, and division of the former into two subclasses corresponding to Clades I and II respectively, the Enoplia and Dorylaimia.

However, some researchers have contested this hypothesis, finding instead support for Dorylaimia and Chromadoria being sister groups while Enoplia is sister to all other nematodes, making Enoplea paraphyletic. The classification proposed by Hodda (2022) removes Dorylaimia from Enoplea, making it a separate class, as shown below.

=== Subdivision ===
Two subclasses are divided into orders.

- Subclass Enoplia
  - Order Enoplida
  - Order Trefusiida
  - Order Triplonchida
- Subclass Dorylaimia
  - Order Dorylaimida
  - Order Mermithida
  - Order Mononchida
  - Order Dioctophymatida
  - Order Trichinellida
  - Order Isolaimida
  - Order Muspiceida
  - Order Marimermithida

=== Classification proposed by Hodda (2022) ===
Class Dorylaimea

- Subclass Dorylaimia
- Subclass Bathyodontia
- Subclass Trichocephalia

Class Enoplea

- Subclass Enoplia
  - Superorder Enoplica
    - Order Enoplida
    - Order Ironida
    - Order Tripyloidida
    - Order Alaimida
    - Order Trefusiida
  - Superorder Rhaptothyreica
    - Order Rhaptothyreida
- Subclass Oncholaimia
  - Superorder Oncholaimica
    - Order Oncholaimida
- Subclass Triplonchia
  - Superorder Triplonchica
    - Order Triplonchida
    - Order Tripylida

== Ecology ==
Several orders of enopleans are mainly freshwater animals, and several include marine species.

Many enopleans are parasites of plants and animals, including humans. The orders Triplonchida and Dorylaimida include plant-parasitic nematodes that are vectors of plant pathogens. The orders Mermithida and Marimermithida include parasites of invertebrates. The orders Dioctophymatida, Trichinellida, and Muspiceida include parasites of vertebrates such as birds and mammals. Examples are Trichinella spiralis, a nematode known for causing trichinosis in humans who consume it in undercooked pork, Haycocknema perplexum which can be life-threatening to humans, and whipworms (genus Trichuris), which are parasites of mammals, including cats, dogs, and humans.

== Bibliography ==
- Lee, Donald L, ed. (2010). The biology of nematodes. London: Taylor & Francis. ISBN 978-0415272117.
- Zhang, Zhi-Qiang, ed. (2011). Animal biodiversity : an outline of higher-level classification and survey of taxonomic richness. Auckland, N.Z.: Magnolia Press. ISBN 978-1869778491.
- Blaxter, Mark L.; De Ley, Paul; Garey, James R.; Liu, Leo X.; Scheldeman, Patsy; Vierstraete, Andy; Vanfleteren, Jacques R.; Mackey, Laura Y.; Dorris, Mark; Frisse, Linda M.; Vida, J. T.; Thomas, W. Kelley (5 March 1998). "A molecular evolutionary framework for the phylum Nematoda". Nature. 392 (6671): 71–75. Bibcode:1998Natur.392...71B. doi:10.1038/32160. PMID 9510248. S2CID 4301939.
