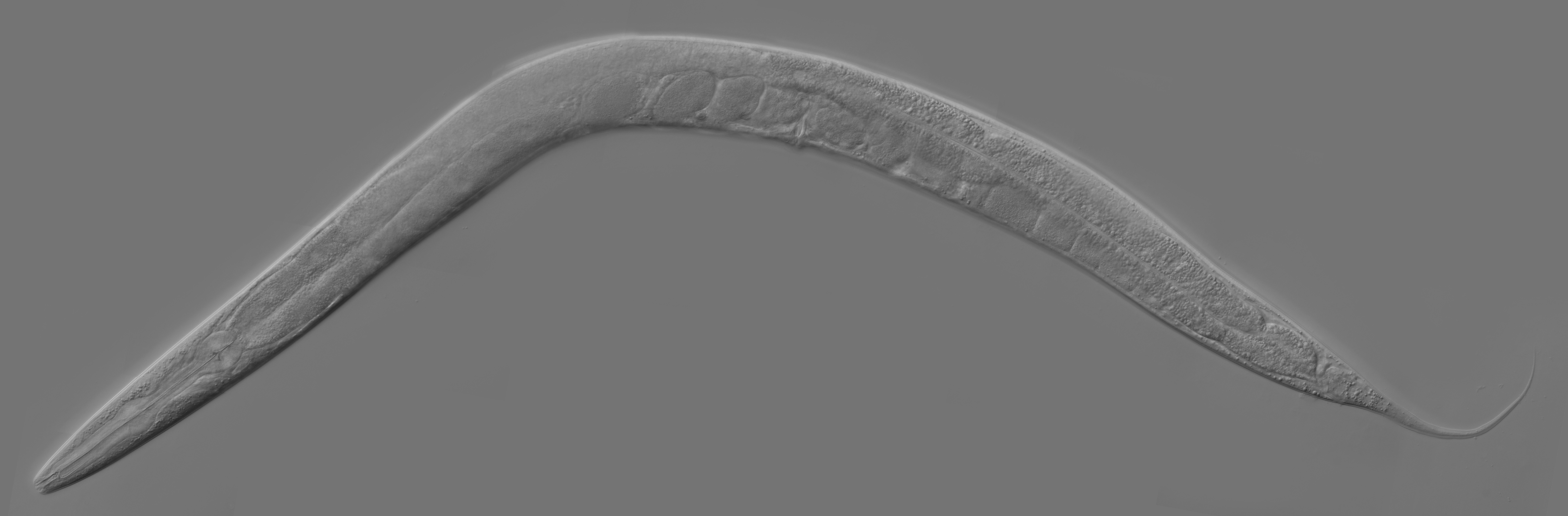
- Caenorhabditis elegans

Scientific classification
- Kingdom: Animalia
- Phylum: Nematoda
- Class: Chromadorea
- Subclass: Chromadoria
- Order: Rhabditida; Chitwood, 1933

Suborders
- Myolaimina; Rhabditina; Spirurina; Tylenchina

= Rhabditida =

Order of roundworms

Rhabditida is an order of different nematodes that can be found as free-living (non-parasitic) organisms, parasites, or microbivores living in soil.

The Cephalobidae, Panagrolaimidae, Steinernematidae, and Strongyloididae seem to be closer to the Tylenchia, regardless of whether these are merged with the Rhabditia or not.

== Families ==
Rhabditida

- Myolaimina
  - Incertae sedis
    - Myolaimoidea
      - Myolaimidae
- Rhabditina
  - Bunonematomorpha
    - Bunonematoidea
      - Bunonematidae
      - Pterygorhabditidae
  - Diplogasteromorpha
    - Cylindrocorporoidea
      - Cylindrocorporidae
    - Diplogasteroidea
      - Cephalobiidae
      - Diplogasteridae
      - Diplogasteroididae
  - Rhabditomorpha
    - Mesorhabditoidea
      - Peloderidae
    - Rhabditoidea
      - Rhabditidae
- Spirurina
  - Ascaridomorpha
    - Ascaridoidea
      - Acanthocheilidae
      - Anisakidae
      - Ascarididae
      - Heterocheilidae
      - Raphidascarididae
    - Cosmocercoidea
      - Atractidae
      - Kathlaniidae
    - Seuratoidea
      - Cucullanidae
      - Quimperiidae
  - Gnathostomatomorpha
    - Gnathostomatoidea
      - Gnathostomatidae
  - Oxyuridomorpha
    - Oxyuroidea
      - Pharygnodonidae
    - Thelastomatoidea
      - Thelastomatidae
  - Spiruromorpha
    - Acuarioidea
      - Acuariidae
    - Camallanoidea
      - Camallanidae
    - Filarioidea
      - Onchocercidae
    - Habronematoidea
      - Cystidicolidae
      - Tetrameridae
    - Physalopteroidea
      - Physalopteridae
    - Thelazioidea
      - Rhabdochonidae
- Tylenchina
  - Cephalobomorpha
    - Cephaloboidea
      - Cephalobidae
  - Drilonematomorpha
    - Drilonematoidea
      - Drilonematidae
      - Homungellidae
      - Ungellidae
  - Panagrolaimomorpha
    - Panagrolaimoidea
      - Panagrolaimidae
    - Strongyloidoidea
      - Alloionematidae
  - Tylenchomorpha
    - Aphelenchoidea
      - Aphelenchidae
      - Aphelenchoididae
    - Criconematoidea
      - Criconematidae
      - Hemicycliophoridae
    - Sphaerularioidea
      - Anguinidae
      - Neotylenchidae
    - Tylenchoidea
      - Belonolaimidae
      - Dolichodoridae
      - Hoplolaimidae
      - Incertae sedis
        - Deladenus Thorne, 1941
        - Paratylenchus Micoletzky, 1922
        - Radopholus Thorne, 1949
        - Tylenchorhynchus Cobb, 1913
      - Pratylenchidae
      - Tylenchidae
