= List of freshwater fauna of Sri Lanka =

Sri Lanka is an island close to the southern end of India with a tropical environment. The freshwater fauna is as large as it is common to other regions of the world. There are about two million species of arthropods found in the world, and still it is counting with many new species still being discovered. It is very complicated and difficult to summarize the exact number of species found within a certain region.

== Freshwater habitats ==
Freshwater animals are important to the economy of a country. The animal life in freshwater comprises a great diversity. The organisms ranging from tiny protozoa to large mammals in size. Sri Lanka is a hydraulic civilization. First civilizations in Sri Lanka were originated closer to main rivers in Sri Lanka such as Mahaweli, Kelani, Malwathu and Gin Ganga. Rivers in Sri Lanka flow in a radial pattern, from central hills where there are numerous waterfalls, the rivers flowing to the west, east and south being shorter than thoe flowing to north., north west and north east. Several streams join these rivers. Some of the streams in the hill country and mid country are quick flowing streams known as torrential streams.

Sri Lankan freshwater habitats can be divided into 6 major types - river, stream, lake, pond, villu and paddy field - according to size, depth, rate of flow and type of bottom. Medium-sized rivers are called Oya and fast flowing streams torrential streams are called Dola in Sinhalese. The following list provide the freshwater fauna of Sri Lanka.

== Adaptations of freshwater fauna ==
The life history of any animal is divisible into 3 phases, initially a period of slow development, followed by a rapid growth with a voracious appetite and finally to an adult which breeds at regular intervals and continue to grow slowly. Most freshwater animals breed during or after monsoon rains where water is available for the young to spread over a wide area where crowding is less and there is a plentiful supply of food in the form of minute plants and animals.

During dry season, conditions in temporary habitats become less and less favourable for aquatic animals. Those cut off in small habitats are quickly killed off, others in larger habitats survive longer. During this period, food become scarce and water level reduces. Animals become weakened or diseased and die or are eaten by birds and terrestrial animals. Many freshwater animals show adaptations to drought conditions. Fish with air breathing ability, utilize atmospheric oxygen to moisten gills, mud burrowing ability are some of them. Smaller crustaceans, produce eggs with hard resistant covering capable of surviving even a severe drought. These cysts are blown by wind and the species is dispersed. Freshwater crabs and prawns carry their eggs until they hatch out, while leeches carry the young in a pouch.

== Researches on Sri Lankan freshwater fauna ==
Knowledge of Sri Lankan freshwater fauna has been considerably enhanced in the last twenty years or so in two ways. One is through the publication of monographs. The other way is through Swedish Expedition and Smithsonian Institution. Several animals groups were identified extensively from Sri Lanka, such as fish, amphibians, odonates and arthropods. Other freshwater fauna of Sri Lanka need more detailed work, which are currently based on the notes of way back in British period. According to the National Red Data List in 2012, many freshwater habitats are degraded at an alarming rate due to rapid human interference. Habitat destruction, fragmentation and loss of forest cover has increased in past decade rapidly. The result becomes severe, where many amphibians have been not recorded after their discovery, which led the scientists to categorize Sri Lanka as a biodiversity hotspot.

== Protozoa ==
=== Family: Amoebidae ===
Phylum: Amoebozoa
Class: Tubulinea
Order: Tubulinida

- Amoeba verrucosa

=== Family: Actinophryidae ===
Phylum: Ochrophyta
Order: Actinochrysophyceae

- Actinophrys sol

=== Family: Arcellidae ===
Phylum: Amoebozoa
Class: Tubulinea
Order: Arcellinida

- Arcella discoides
- Arcella vulgaris
- Sphenoderia lenta

=== Family: Centropyxidae ===
Phylum: Amoebozoa
Class: Tubulinea
Order: Arcellinida

- Centropyxis aculeata

=== Family: Ceratiaceae ===
Phylum: Dinoflagellata
Class: Dinophyceae
Order: Gonyaulacales

- Ceratium hirudinella

=== Family: Clathrulinidae ===
Phylum: Cercozoa
Class: Granofilosea
Order: Desmothoracida

- Clathrulina elegans

=== Family: Codonellidae ===
Phylum: Ciliophora
Class: Oligotrichea
Order: Choreotrichida

- Codonella lacustris
- Tintinnopsis ovalis

=== Family: Difflugiidae ===
Phylum: Amoebozoa
Class: Tubulinea
Order: Arcellinida

- Difflugia acuminata
- Difflugia arcula
- Difflugia constricta
- Difflugia corona
- Difflugia globulosa
- Difflugia lobostoma
- Difflugia pyriformis
- Difflugia urceolata
- Lesquereusia spiralis

=== Family: Epistylididae ===
Phylum: Ciliophora
Class: Ciliatea
Order: Sessilida

- Epistylis anastatica

=== Family: Euglenaceae ===
Phylum: Euglenozoa
Class: Euglenoidea
Order: Euglenales

- Euglena sp.

=== Family: Euglyphidae ===
Phylum: Cercozoa
Class: Imbricatea
Order: Euglyphida

- Euglypha alveolata
- Euglypha ciliata
- Trinema enchelys

=== Family: Glaucomidae ===
Phylum: Ciliophora
Class: Oligohymenophorea
Order: Tetrahymenida

- Colpoda cucullus

=== Family: Hyalospheniidae ===
Phylum: Amoebozoa
Class: Tubulinea
Order: Arcellinida

- Hyalosphenia elegans
- Hyalosphenia papilio

=== Family: Ichthyophthiriidae ===
Phylum: Ciliophora
Class: Oligohymenophorea
Order: Hymenostomatida

- Ichthyophthirius multifiliis

=== Family: Oxytrichidae ===
Phylum: Ciliophora
Class: Spirotrichea

- Oxytricha mystacea
- Stylonychia pustulata

=== Family: Parameciidae ===
Phylum: Ciliophora
Class: Oligohymenophorea
Order: Peniculida

- Paramecium sp.

=== Family: Pelomyxidae ===
Phylum: Amoebozoa
Class: Archamoebae
Order: Pelobiontida

- Pelomyxa quarta

=== Family: Peridiniaceae ===
Phylum: Myzozoa
Class: Dinophyceae
Order: Peridiniales

- Peridinium tabulatum

=== Family: Trichodinidae ===
Phylum: Ciliophora
Class: Oligohymenophorea
Order: Peritrichida

- Cyclochaeta domerguei

=== Family: Volvocaceae ===
Phylum: Chlorophyta
Class: Chlorophyceae
Order: Chlamydomonadales

- Volvox aureus

=== Family: Vorticellidae ===
Phylum: Ciliophora
Class: Oligohymenophorea
Order: Sessilida

- Vorticella sp.

== Moss animals ==
Phylum: Bryozoa
Class: Phylactolaemata
Order: Plumatellida

=== Family: Pectinatellidae ===
- Pectinatella burmanica

=== Family: Plumatellidae ===
- Plumatella emarginata
- Plumatella longigemmis

== Hairybacks ==
Phylum: Gastrotricha
Order: Chaetonotida

=== Family: Chaetonotidae ===
- Chaetonotus (Chaetonotus) larus
- Ichthydium (Ichthydium) podura

== Sponges ==
Phylum: Porifera
Class: Demospongiae
Order: Spongillida

=== Family: Spongillidae ===
- Eunapius carteri
- Radiospongilla cerebellata

== Cnidarians ==
Phylum: Cnidaria
Class: Hydrozoa
Order: Anthoathecata

=== Family: Hydridae ===
- Hydra Vulgaris
- Hydra zeylandica

== Wheel animals ==
Phylum: Rotifera

Sri Lankan freshwaters are home for 124 species of wheel animals.

== Flatworms ==
Phylum: Xenacoelomorpha
Order: Acoela

=== Family: Convolutidae ===
- Convoluta anotica

Phylum: Platyhelminthes
Order: Rhabdocoela

=== Family: Scutariellidae ===
- Caridinicola platei
- Monodiscus macbridei
- Monodiscus parvus

=== Family: Typhloplanidae ===
- Mesostoma ehrenbergii
- Strongylostoma radiatum

Phylum: Platyhelminthes
Class: Trematoda
Order: Plagiorchiida

=== Family: Pleurogenidae ===
- Pleurogenoides sitapuri

Phylum: Platyhelminthes
Class: Cestoda
Order: Bothriocephalidea

=== Family: Bothriocephalidae ===
- Senga lucknowensis

== Roundworms ==
Phylum: Nematoda
Class: Enoplea
Order: Dorylaimida

=== Family: Dorylaimidae ===
- Dorylaimus sp.

Class: Chromadorea
Order: Rhabditida

=== Family: Camallanidae ===
- Zeylanema anabantis
- Zeylanema fernandoi
- Zeylanema kulasirii
- Zeylanema mastacembeli
- Zeylanema pearsi
- Zeylanema sweeti
- Procammallanus spiculogubernaculus
- Procammallanus planoratus

== Gordian worms ==
Phylum: Nematomorpha
Class: Gordioida
Order: Chordodea

=== Family: Chordodidae ===
- Chordodes skorikowi
- Chordodes verrucosus
- Paragordius tricuspidatus

== Segmented worms ==
Phylum: Annelida

=== Family: Aeolosomatidae ===
- Aeolosoma ternarium

Class: Clitellata
Order: Haplotaxida

=== Family: Naididae ===
- Allonais paraguayensis
- Aulophorus michaelseni
- Aulophorus tonkinensis
- Bothrioneurum iris
- Chaetogaster sp.
- Dero digitata
- Dero zeylanica
- Limnodrilus hoffmeisteri
- Pristina (Pristina) breviseta
- Pristina (Pristina) proboscidea

=== Family: Almidae ===
- Glyphidrilus sp.

Order: Rhynchobdellida

=== Family: Ozobranchidae ===
- Ozobranchus shipleyi

=== Family: Galeommatidae ===
- Hirudinaria manillensis

=== Family: Glossiphoniidae ===
- Paraclepsis vulnifera
- Placobdella ceylanica
- Placobdella emydae
- Placobdella undulata
- Limnatus paluda
- Dinobdella ferox

Order: Arhynchobdellida

=== Family: Hirudinidae ===
- Hirudo birmanica
- Hirudinaria manillensis

== Molluscs ==
Phylum: Mollusca
Class: Gastropoda
Order: Cycloneritida

=== Family: Neritidae ===
- Septaria livesayi
- Septaria reticulata
- Septaria squamata
- Theodoxus perotetiana

Order: Caenogastropoda

=== Family: Pachychilidae ===
- Faunus ater
- Melanoides broti
- Melanoides crenulata
- Melanoides lineata
- Melanoides tuberculata

=== Family: Thiaridae ===
- Thiara datura
- Thiara rudia
- Thiara scabra
