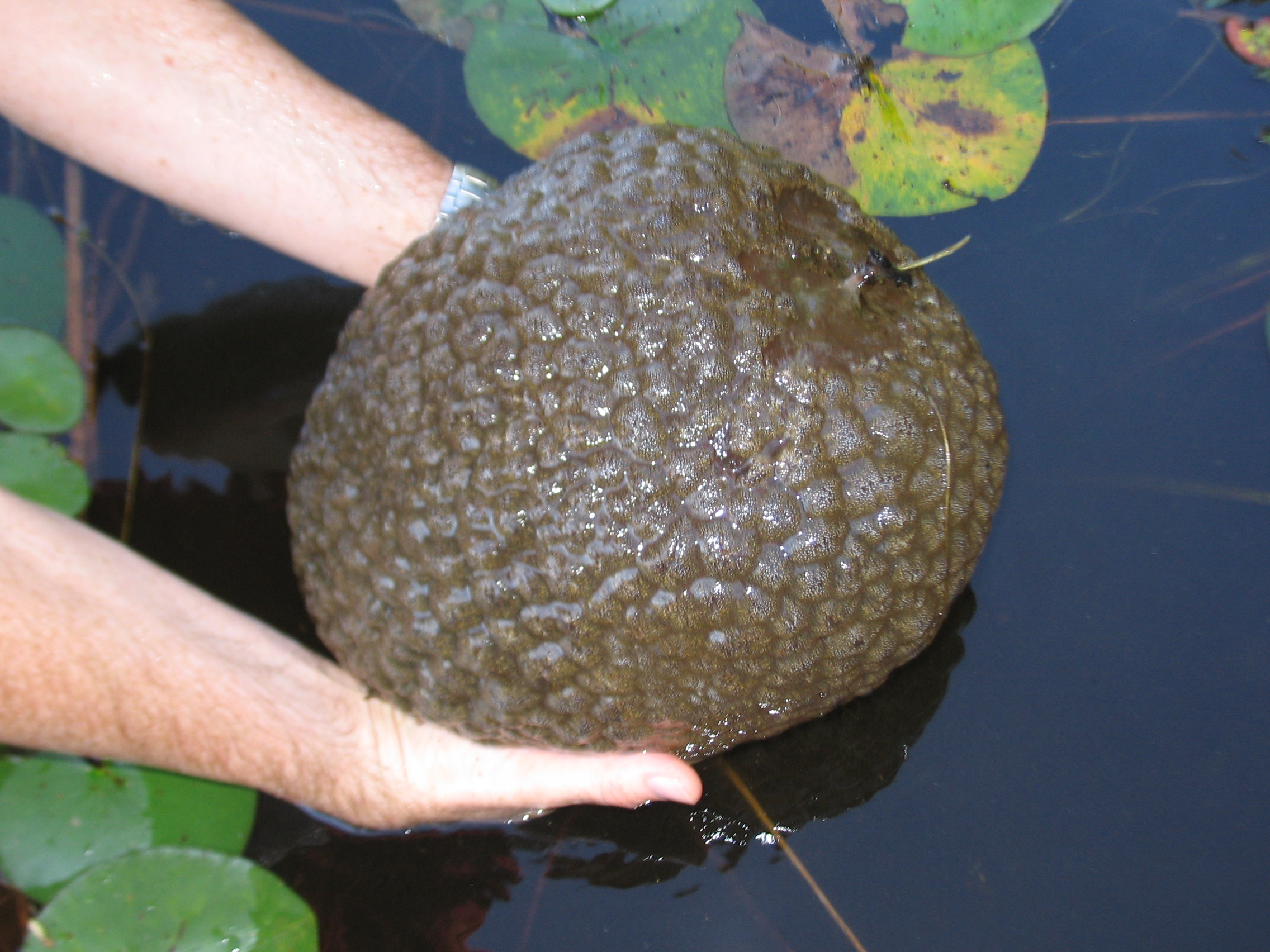
- A colony of P. magnifica lifted above water.

Scientific classification
- Kingdom: Animalia
- Phylum: Bryozoa
- Class: Phylactolaemata
- Order: Plumatellida
- Family: Pectinatellidae; Lacourt, 1968

Genera
- Pectinatella

= Pectinatellidae =

Family of bryozoans

Pectinatellidae is a monotypic family of freshwater bryozoans belonging to the class Phylactolaemata. Like most bryozoans, they are colonial and filter feeding organisms. These organisms lack a calcareous exterior, instead forming gelatinous colonies.

The family contains only one known species: Pectinatella magnifica. They are found globally throughout North America, Europe, and Asia.

== Pectinatella magnifica ==
Pectinatella magnifica (P. magnifica) is the only identified species in the family Pectinatellidae. It was discovered by Joseph Leidy in 1851, near Philadelphia. They are especially unique compared to other bryozoan colonies in that they are able to grow up to 2 meters (6.6 ft) in diameter, making them some of the largest bryozoan colonies.

== Phylogeny ==
Phylogenetic relationships between the seven families in the Phylactolaemata class are unresolved and remain a subject of scientific debate. The two main methods for genus and species identification are analysis of molecular DNA and inspection of statoblast morphology under a microscope.

Pectinatellidae has recently been placed in the Pectinatella–Cristatella–P. fruticosa clade, with sister taxa Cristatellidae and "Plumatella" fruticosa, the last of which "thus is not a plumatellid." The ancestor to Pectinatellidae and Cristatellidae likely diverged from P. fruticosa in the Permian period. Later, Pectinatellidae and Cristatellidae diverged from each other during the Middle Triassic. The gelatinous morphology (see below) of the PCP clade is assumed to be a distinct character state, derived from the ancestral "branching type" morphology seen in other phylactolaemate bryozoans.

== Morphology ==
Pectinatellidae form massive gelatinous colonies, attached to solid substrates. A single gelatinous mass of Pectinatellidae is often created by multiple related colonies, derived from a single statoblast. They have two white spots at the end of each lophophore arm, and red pigmentation on mouthparts. Additionally, the lophophore forms a distinct U-shape.

=== Spinoblasts ===
Pectinatellidae form buoyant structures called floatoblasts, one of three types of free statoblasts found in bryozoans. Pectinatellidae is one of two families (the other being Cristatellidae) that produce only one type of floatoblast called a spinoblast.

In P. magnifica, the double-hooked spines of the statoblast originate at the periphery of the annulus, unlike in Cristatellidae. The number of spines ranges from 11-22, and is most variable characteristic in P. magnifica.

=== Reproduction ===
Pectinatellidae shares the same reproduction strategies as all phylactolemate bryozoans. While they primarily reproduce asexually through either budding or by producing statoblasts, they are also capable of sexual reproduction with each individual zooid being hermaphroditic.

=== Motility ===
While most bryozoans are sessile, motility has been observed in the gelatinous species, which includes P. magnifica. This motility is essential for colony survival among changing water levels.

The free swimming larvae of P. magnifica have specialized swimming structures composed of a ciliated outer mantle and an inner mass containing two zooids.

== Distribution ==
P. magnifica originated in north-eastern North America, but has expanded in range to various localities throughout North America, Europe, and Asia. They live in warm, shallow, and calm freshwater ecosystems, only inhabiting waters above 12 °C (54 °F).

They are considered an invasive species in Europe and Asia after their introduction in the 19th century.

Methods of distribution include:

- Distribution of reproductive floatoblasts by birds (on feathers & feet, and in gut.)
- Human activity (fish and aquatic plant trade, shipping, etc.)

=== Ecological Importance ===
In Europe and Asia where P. magnifica has been introduced, the colonies out-compete other organisms and create a variety of issues across industries, including:

- Biofouling of freshwater ecosystems.
- Attaching to mussel cages and thus impacting production on mussel farms.
- Clog intake screens, pipes, and fishing nets, creating problems for hydroelectric power plants and water-based industries.
- Hosting the myxozoan parasite Tetracapsuloides bryosalmonae, which causes proliferative kidney disease (PKD) in salmonid fish.
