= Crassolabium elegans =

Scientific classification
- Domain: Eukaryota
- Kingdom: Animalia
- Phylum: Nematoda
- Class: Enoplea
- Order: Dorylaimida
- Family: Qudsianematidae
- Genus: Crassolabium
- Species: C. elegans

Binomial name
- Crassolabium elegans (Thorne, 1974)

Species of roundworm

Crassolabium elegans is a species of nematode in the family Qudsianematidae. It is from the Northern Great Plains.
