= Saccosporidae =

Scientific classification
- Kingdom: Animalia
- Phylum: Cnidaria
- Subphylum: Myxozoa
- Class: Malacosporea; Canning, Curry, Feist, Longshaw & Okamura, 2000
- Order: Malacovalvulida; Canning, Curry, Feist, Longshaw & Okamura, 2000
- Family: Saccosporidae; Canning, Okamura & Curry, 1996

Genera
- See text

Family of marine parasites

Saccosporidae is a family of myxozoans. It is the only family within the class Malacosporea and has only five described species, whereas the other class of Myxozoa, Myxosporea, includes more than a thousand.

== Taxonomy and systematics ==
The following species are known:

- Genus Buddenbrockia Schröder, 1910
  - Buddenbrockia allmani Canning, Curry, Hill & Okamura, 2007
  - Buddenbrockia bryozoides (Canning, Okamura, Curry, 1996)
  - Buddenbrockia plumatellae Schröder, 1910
  - Buddenbrockia sp. 1
  - Buddenbrockia sp. 2
  - Buddenbrockia sp. 3
  - Buddenbrockia sp. 4
- Genus Tetracapsuloides Canning, Tops, Curry, Wood & Okamura, 2002
  - Tetracapsuloides bryosalmonae (Canning, Curry, Feist, Longshaw & Okamura, 1999)
  - Tetracapsuloides vermiformis Patra, Hartigan, Morris, Kodádková, Holzer, 2017
  - Tetracapsuloides sp. 1
  - Tetracapsuloides sp. 2
  - Tetracapsuloides sp. 3
  - Tetracapsuloides sp. 4
  - Tetracapsuloides sp. 5
- Novel lineage 1
- Novel lineage 2
- Novel lineage 3

== Description ==
Saccosporidae are parasites of fish and freshwater bryozoans. Tetracapsuloides bryosalmonae, the only representative of the group whose life cycle is well studied, causes proliferative disease of the kidneys in salmonids. Two stages of the life cycles of the two species in the genus Buddenbrockia are known. One of them is a saccular stage, similar to Tetracapsuloides. During the second stage the animals are mobile and superficially resemble minute worms. Buddenbrockia allmani parasitizes Lophopus crystallinus, while Buddenbrockia plumatellae parasitizes, in particular, Plumatella fungosa.
