= Alaimus primitivus =

Scientific classification
- Domain: Eukaryota
- Kingdom: Animalia
- Phylum: Nematoda
- Class: Enoplea
- Order: Dorylaimida
- Family: Alaimidae
- Genus: Alaimus
- Species: A. primitivus

Binomial name
- Alaimus primitivus de Man, 1880

Species of roundworm

Alaimus primitivus is a species of nematode belonging to the family Alaimidae.

It is native to Europe.
