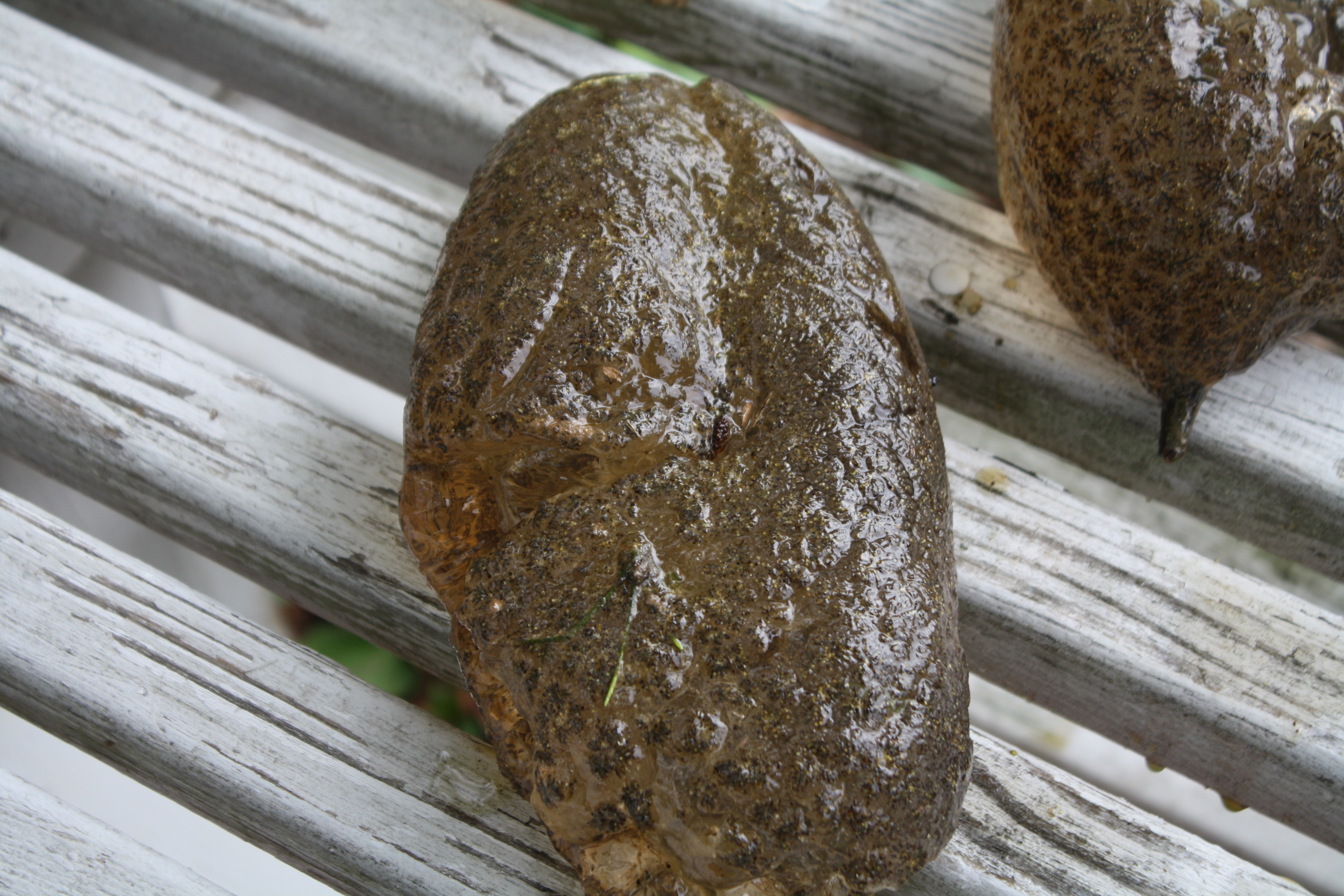

Scientific classification
- Kingdom: Animalia
- Phylum: Bryozoa
- Class: Phylactolaemata
- Order: Plumatellida
- Family: Pectinatellidae
- Genus: Pectinatella
- Species: P. magnifica

Binomial name
- Pectinatella magnifica (Leidy, 1851)

Synonyms
- Cristatella magnifica Leidy, 1851; Pectinatella magnifica Allman, 1856

= Pectinatella magnifica =

Species of moss animal

Pectinatella magnifica, the magnificent bryozoan, is a member of the Bryozoa phylum, in the order Plumatellida. It is a colony of organisms that bind together; these colonies can sometimes be 60 centimeters (2 feet) in diameter.

The individual organisms, termed zooids, feed using a lophophore in which cilia on the tentacles capture microscopic organic particles from the water and transport them to the mouth.

These organisms can be found mostly in North America, with some in Europe. They are often found attached to objects, but can be found free floating as well. They form a translucent body with many star-like blooms along the outside. The density of the organism is similar to that of gelatin, and is easily breakable into smaller chunks.

== Gallery ==
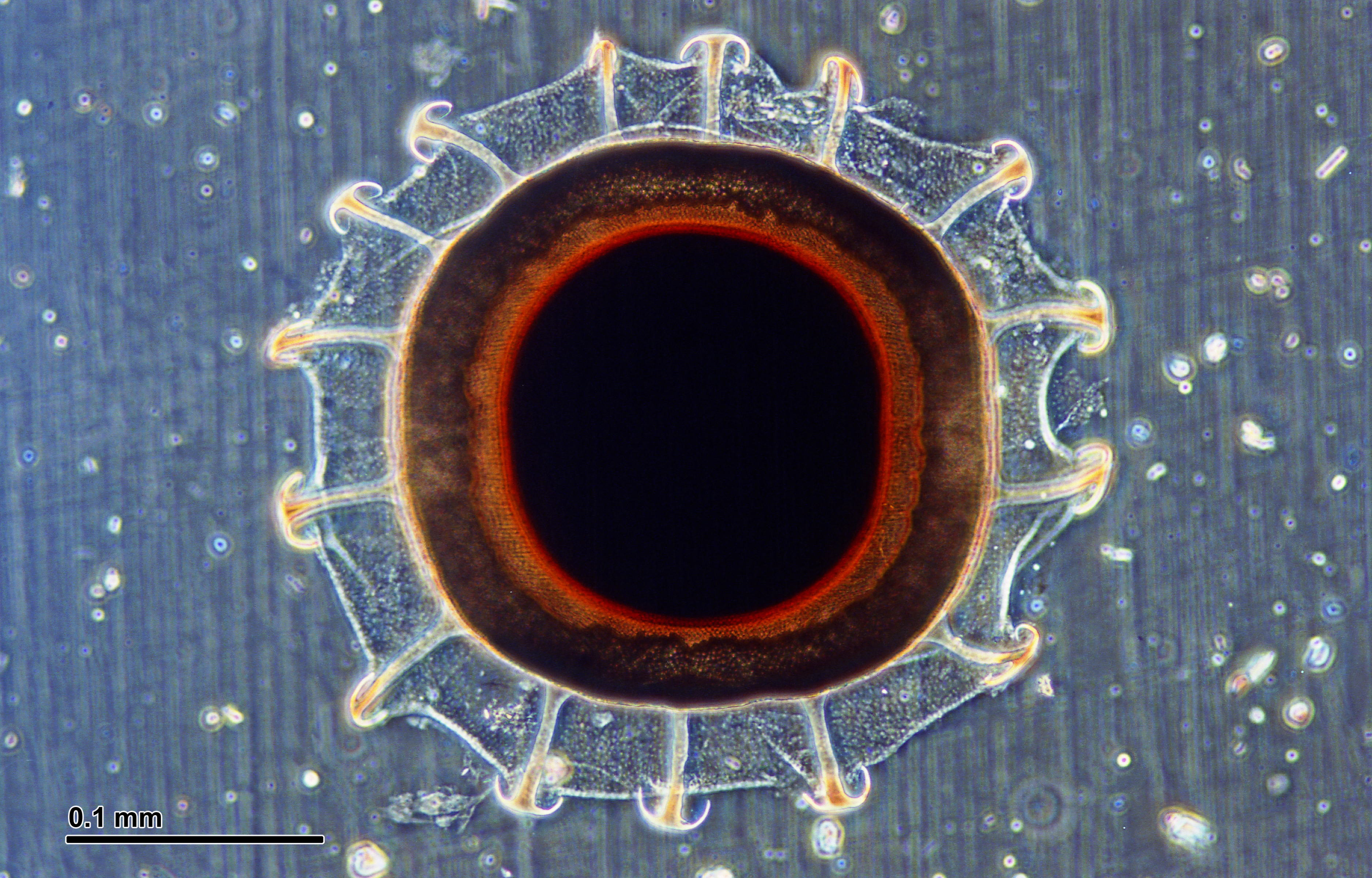
Statoblast of P. magnifica

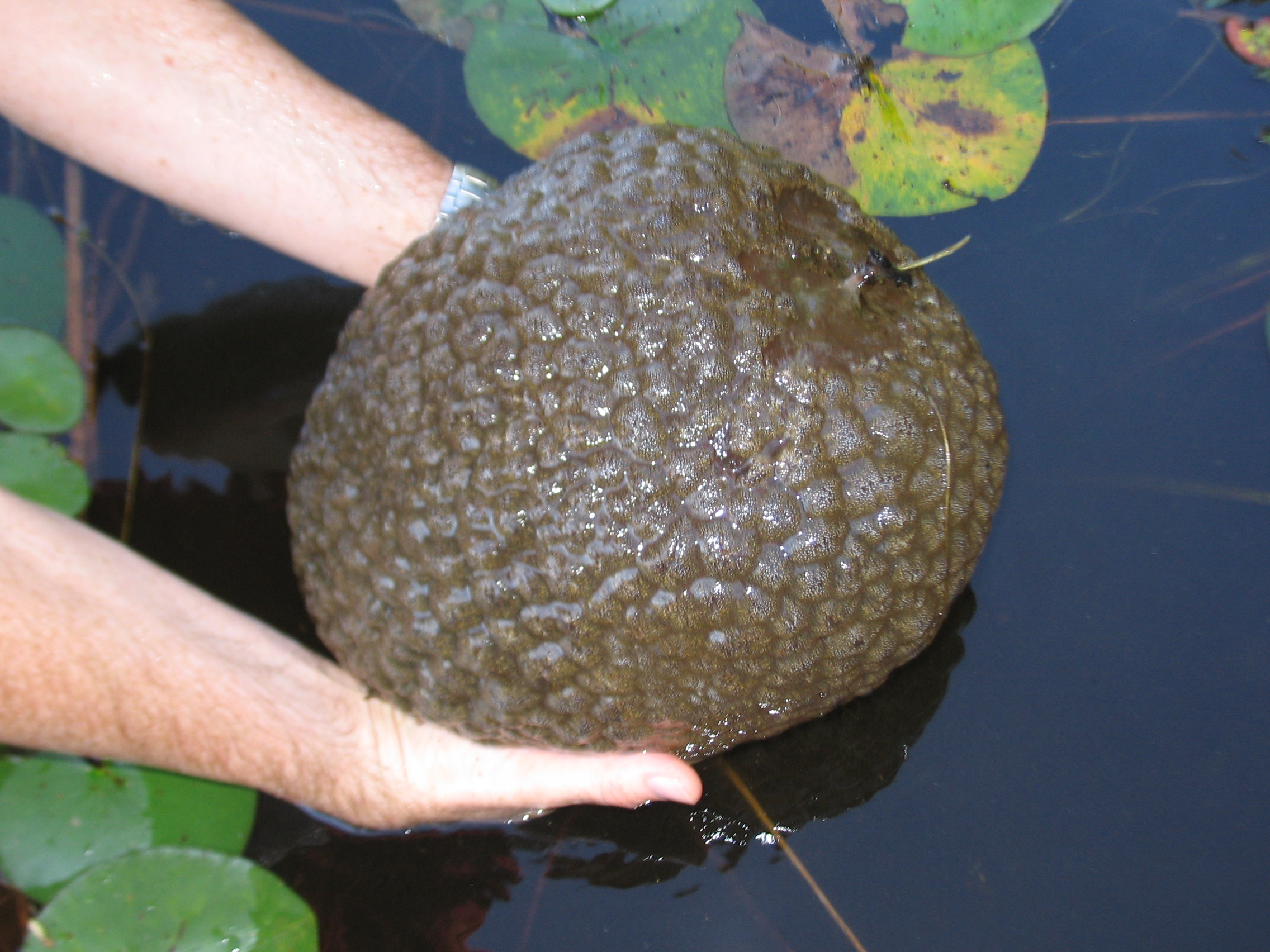
Picked up from water

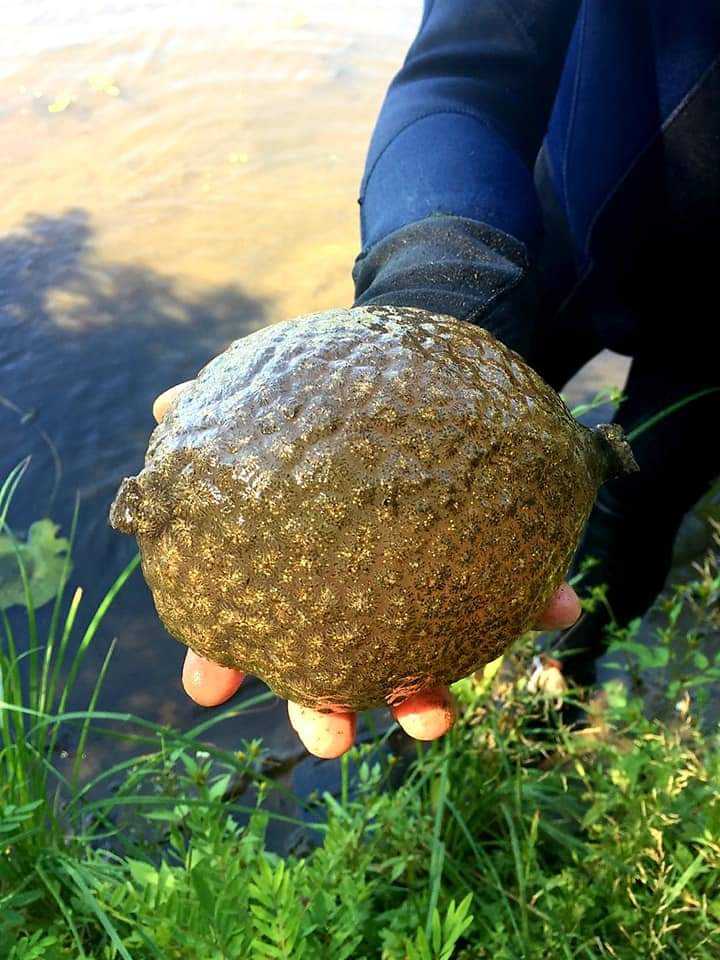
Exemplar caught in Ukraine in the Dnieper near Kyiv
