= Tetracapsuloides =

Scientific classification
- Kingdom: Animalia
- Phylum: Cnidaria
- Class: Malacosporea
- Order: Malacovalvulida
- Family: Saccosporidae
- Genus: Tetracapsuloides; Canning, Tops, Curry, Wood & Okamura (2002)
- Species: T. bryosalmonae

Binomial name
- Tetracapsuloides bryosalmonae Canning et al. (1999)

Synonyms
- Tetracapsuloides renicola; Tetracapsula bryosalmonae

Genus of marine parasites

Tetracapsuloides bryosalmonae is a myxozoan parasite of salmonid fish. It is the only species currently recognized in the monotypic genus Tetracapsuloides. It is the cause of proliferative kidney disease (PKD), one of the most serious parasitic diseases of salmonid populations in Europe and North America. The disease can result in losses of up to 90% in infected populations.

== Taxonomy ==
Until the late 1990s, the organism which caused PKD was enigmatic, thus called PKX organism. The causative agent of PKD was recognized as a form of Malacosporean. The absence of mature spores in salmonid hosts, the lack of fish-to-fish transmission, and seasonality of the disease suggesting that the life cycle of PKX was completed in another host and that infection of salmonids could be accidental. Aleksei Korotnev (Korotneff) observed a myxozoan in the bryozoan, Plumatella fungosa, in 1892, which he described as Myxosporidium bryozoides. Myxozoan infection of bryozoans was not reported again until 1996. Ecological investigations of freshwater bryozoans in North America discovered parasitic sacs of a myxozoan species freely floating in the body cavities of several bryozoans. Molecular analyses indicated that the 18S rDNA sequences of these sacs were indistinguishable from those of PKX. In 2000, the PKX organism was scientifically described as Tetracapsuloides bryosalmonae, and assigned to a new class, Malacosporea, within the phylum Myxozoa. In the same year, another group of researchers described the PKX organism from Arctic char, Salvelinus alpinus, as Tetracapsuloides renicola. According to the rules of binomial nomenclature however, the first given name takes priority.

== Life cycle ==
T. bryosalmonae has a two-host life cycle, as other myxosporeans, cycling between freshwater bryozoa and salmonid fish species, rather than an oligochaete or polychaete worm as for Myxobolus cerebralis. To date, T. bryosalmonae has been found to parasitize at least five freshwater bryozoans Phylactolaemata species belonging to the genera Fredericella and Plumatella, all considered to be primitive genera. Infected bryozoans release mature T. bryosalmonae malacospores during overt infections when large spore sacs are freely floating within their coelomic cavity. Bryozoan dispersal strategies, including colony fragmentation, statoblast dispersal and the formation of migrating zooids allow their colonization of new habitats and the spreading of infective T. bryosalmonae stages.

== Pathology ==
Proliferative kidney disease (PKD) is characterized by a swollen kidney and spleen, bloody ascites, and pale gills, indicating the fish becomes anemic at the late stage of the disease. Note that those symptoms are common amongst many other fish diseases and do not specifically indicate an infection with Tetracapsuloides bryosalmonae. It is important to clarify the pathologic condition only happens in species particularly susceptible to T. bryosalmonae. In those cases, the parasite is allowed to cross the renal tubules wall to proliferate within the interstitial tissue of kidney (histozoic proliferation). This proliferation stage is not a dead-end for the parasite (extrasporogonic proliferation), but instead causes a tumour-like tissue reaction in the kidney. In turn, this induces chronic lymphoid hyperplasia marked by a strong parasite-driven immunosuppressant pathogenesis and a dysregulation of T-helper subsets.

== Distribution ==
T. bryosalmonae has been recorded in both Europe and North America. Phylogenetic analyses of internal transcribed spacer 1 sequences revealed a clade composed of all North American sequences plus a subset of Italian and French sequences. High genetic diversity in North America and the absence of genotypes which are characteristic of the North American clade in the rest of Europe implies that Southern Europe was colonized by immigration from North America. Sequence divergence however, suggests that this colonization substantially pre-dated human movements of fish. Furthermore, the lack of Southern European lineages in the rest of Europe, despite widespread rainbow trout farming, indicates that T. bryosalmonae is not transported through fisheries activities. This result contrasts with the prevalence of fishery-related introductions of other pathogens and parasites such as Myxobolus cerebralis and Ceratomyxa shasta. PKD is a serious immunopathology causing a high mortality rate, with a relevant economic impact for trout aquaculture in Europe and North America.
