= Crassolabium =

Scientific classification
- Domain: Eukaryota
- Kingdom: Animalia
- Phylum: Nematoda
- Class: Enoplea
- Order: Dorylaimida
- Family: Qudsianematidae
- Genus: Crassolabium; Yeates, 1967

Type species
- Crassolabium australe Yeates, 1967

Genus of roundworms

Crassolabium is a genus of nematodes in the family Qudsianematidae.

== Species ==
Crassolabium aenigmaticum - Crassolabium angulosum - Crassolabium australe - Crassolabium baldum - Crassolabium brachycephalum - Crassolabium circuliferum - Crassolabium confusum - Crassolabium cylindricum - Crassolabium diversum - Crassolabium dogieli - Crassolabium elegans - Crassolabium eroshenkoi - Crassolabium ettersbergense - Crassolabium garhwaliense - Crassolabium goaense - Crassolabium gracile - Crassolabium himalum - Crassolabium kaszabi - Crassolabium lautum - Crassolabium major - Crassolabium malagasi - Crassolabium medianum - Crassolabium montanum - Crassolabium neohimalum - Crassolabium nepalense - Crassolabium nothus - Crassolabium papillatum - Crassolabium paracirculifer - Crassolabium parvulum - Crassolabium persicum - Crassolabium plica - Crassolabium porosum - Crassolabium projectum - Crassolabium pumilum - Crassolabium rhopalocercum - Crassolabium robustum - Crassolabium saccatum - Crassolabium seychellense - Crassolabium tenuistylum - Crassolabium vietnamense
