= Centropyxiella elegans =

Scientific classification
- Domain: Eukaryota
- Clade: Amorphea
- Phylum: Amoebozoa
- Class: Tubulinea
- Order: Arcellinida
- Family: Centropyxidae
- Genus: Centropyxiella
- Species: C. elegans

Binomial name
- Centropyxiella elegans Valkanov, 1970

Species of protozoa

Centropyxiella elegans is a species of Amoebozoa in the family Centropyxidae. It is found in the European waters of the North Atlantic Ocean.
