= Hyalinella =

Hyalinella may refer to:

- Hyalinella (bryozoan), a genus of bryozoans in the family Plumatellidae
- Hyalinella (alga), a genus of alga in the family Cymatosiraceae
