= Lophopus crystallinus =

Scientific classification
- Kingdom: Animalia
- Phylum: Bryozoa
- Class: Phylactolaemata
- Order: Plumatellida
- Family: Lophopodidae
- Genus: Lophopus
- Species: L. crystallinus

Binomial name
- Lophopus crystallinus (Pallas, 1768)

Species of moss animal

Lophopus crystallinus, commonly known as the bellflower animal or crystal moss animal, is the first species ever described of the genus Lophopus, from the Lophopodidae family, and is the only member of the family that can be found in the UK.

== Description ==
The species are colonial, and have a gelatinous outer wall. They are fan shaped when viewed with the naked eye.

== Distribution ==
The species is widely distributed in Europe. It can be found in as many as 62 lakes and rivers throughout the UK.

== Feeding ==
It feeds on algae. It prefers cold climate, and is tolerant of eutrophication.

== Life and reproduction ==
The species life cycle is few months. They become dormant in September, and reproduce by winter. They die by March. However, in spring fed pools they could live and reproduce forever. Their sexual reproduction is quite rare, and is poorly known. They grow by budding with different kinds of zooids.

== Conservation ==
It is listed as a priority species under the UK Biodiversity Action Plan.

== Bibliography ==
- Hill S & Okamura BA Review of the ecology of Lophopus crystallinus (Plumatellida, Lophopodidae), a rare species within the UK. na; Biologiezentrum Linz/Austria; Denisia 16, zugleich Kataloge der OÖ.Landesmuseen Neue Serie 28 (2005), 193-201(pdf from Google Drive).
