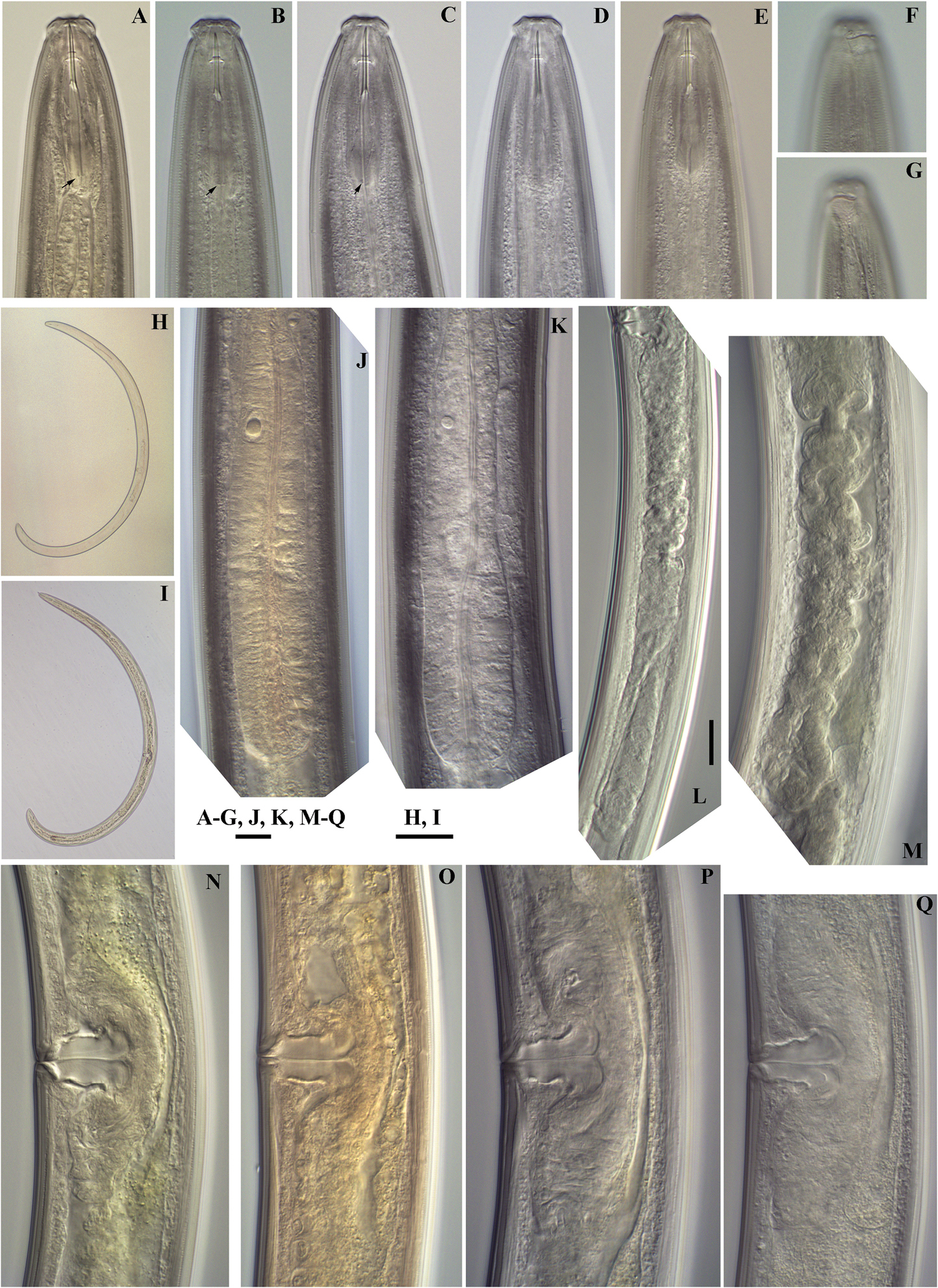
- Enchodeloides signyensis

Scientific classification
- Domain: Eukaryota
- Kingdom: Animalia
- Phylum: Nematoda
- Class: Enoplea
- Order: Dorylaimida
- Family: Nordiidae
- Genus: Enchodeloides; Elshishka, Lazarova, Radoslavov, Hristov & Peneva, 2017
- Species: E. signyensis

Binomial name
- Enchodeloides signyensis (Loof, 1975) Elshishka, Lazarova, Radoslavov, Hristov & Peneva, 2017

= Enchodeloides =

Genus of roundworms

Enchodeloides is a monotypic genus of nematodes belonging to the family Nordiidae. The only species is Enchodeloides signyensis.

The species is found in the South Orkney and South Shetland Islands.
