= Alaimus =

Scientific classification
- Domain: Eukaryota
- Kingdom: Animalia
- Phylum: Nematoda
- Class: Enoplea
- Order: Dorylaimida
- Family: Alaimidae
- Genus: Alaimus de Man, 1880

Genus of roundworms

Alaimus is a genus of nematode belonging to the family Alaimidae.

The genus was first described by J. G. de Man in 1880.

The genus has cosmopolitan distribution.

Species:

- Alaimus primitivus de Man, 1880
