= Lophopus =

Scientific classification
- Kingdom: Animalia
- Phylum: Bryozoa
- Class: Phylactolaemata
- Order: Plumatellida
- Family: Lophopodidae
- Genus: Lophopus; Dumortier, 1835

Genus of moss animals

Lophopus is a genus of bryozoans from the family Lophopodidae.

== Species ==
- Lophopus brisbanensis Colledge, 1917
- Lophopus crystallinus (Pallas, 1768)
- Lophopus jheringi Meissner, 1893
