= PKX (disambiguation) =

Beijing Daxing International Airport, IATA code PKX, is an airport in China.

PKX may also refer to:

- POSCO, traded as PKX on NYSE
- Tetracapsuloides, called PKX organism before it was identified

== See also ==
- Gumdoksuri-class patrol vessel, including PKX-A and PKX-B
