= Dorylaimus =

Scientific classification
- Domain: Eukaryota
- Kingdom: Animalia
- Phylum: Nematoda
- Class: Enoplea
- Order: Dorylaimida
- Family: Dorylaimidae
- Genus: Dorylaimus; Dujardin, 1845

Synonyms
- Darylaimus Linstow, 1878; Donylaimus Linstow, 1876; Dorglaemus Greeff, 1873; Doryglaimus Linstow, 1876; Dorylaemus Schneider, 1866; Urolabes Carter, 1858; Urolabis Bütschli, 1874

Genus of roundworms

Dorylaimus is a genus of Dorylaimidae.

The genus was described in 1845 by Félix Dujardin.

Species:

- Dorylaimus acutines
- Dorylaimus stagnalis
