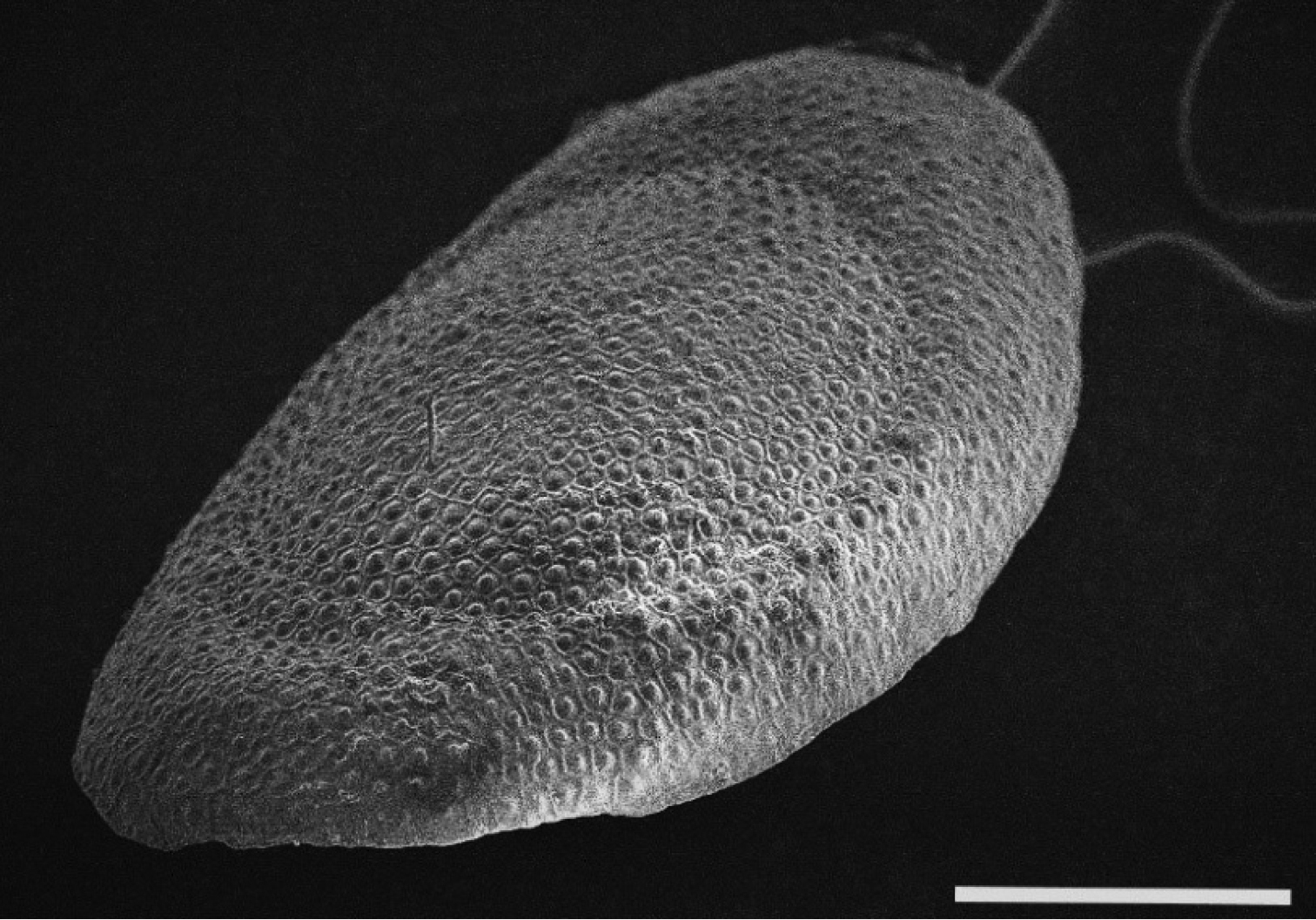

Scientific classification
- Kingdom: Animalia
- Phylum: Bryozoa
- Class: Phylactolaemata
- Order: Plumatellida
- Family: Plumatellidae
- Genus: Plumatella
- Species: P. fungosa

Binomial name
- Plumatella fungosa (Pallas, 1768)

Synonyms
- Tubularia fungosa (Pallas, 1768); Alcyonella fluviatile (Bruguière, 1789); Alcyonella fungosa (Van Beneden, 1848); Alcyonella flabellum (Van Beneden, 1848); Alcyonella fungosa (Allman, 1856); Plumatella polymorpha var. fungosa (Kraepelin, 1887); Plumatella repens var. fungosa (Vangel, 1894); Plumatella repens var. fungosa (Annandale, 1910); Plumatella fungosa (Abrikosov, 1925)

= Plumatella fungosa =

Species of freshwater moss animal

Plumatella fungosa, commonly known as the fungoid bryozoan or knoll bryozoan, is a freshwater species of bryozoan in the family Plumatellidae.

It is generally found in the USA and Europe throughout streams in the North and mountain streams in the South. Plumatella fungosa is the dominant bryozoan in small mountain lakes at around 4,000 metres (13,000 ft) altitude. It is commonly found in waters rich in humic colouration and with pH below 7, conditions which are often seen in waters surrounded by conifers.
