= Buddenbrockia plumatellae =

Scientific classification
- Kingdom: Animalia
- Phylum: Cnidaria
- Class: Malacosporea
- Order: Malacovalvulida
- Family: Saccosporidae
- Genus: Buddenbrockia
- Species: B. plumatellae

Binomial name
- Buddenbrockia plumatellae O. Schröder, 1910

Synonyms
- Tetracapsula bryozoides Canning, Okamura & Curry, 1996

Species of marine parasite

Buddenbrockia plumatellae is a worm-like parasite of bryozoans whose taxonomic placement long puzzled biologists. It is now classified as one of only three myxozoans in the Malacosporea subclass and its only family, Saccosporidae, on the basis of both genetic and ultrastructural studies. It was the first multicellular myxozoan identified and its vermiform shape initially gave strong support to the theory that the enigmatic group belongs among the Bilateria. Five years later, this was refuted by a study of fifty genes from this same "worm", which had rarely been seen since its discovery in 1851. These 50 phylogenetic markers reveal that Buddenbrockia is closely related to jellyfish and sea anemones, typical members of the animalian phylum Cnidaria. Because of the highly divergent nuclear protein sequences of Buddenbrockia, relative to those of the other animals compared in this study, only the use of a sophisticated tree-building approach (i.e., Bayesian inference) allowed for recovery of its cnidarian evolutionary affinities. One of the researchers talked about the problems encountered studying its morphology: "It has no mouth, no gut, no brain and no nerve cord. It doesn't have a left or right side or a top or bottom – we can't even tell which end is the front!" As the myxozoans are now demonstrably non-bilaterian in origin, he concluded that "the worm-like body shape evolved at least twice from two completely different kinds of animal."
