= Aetholaimidae =

Scientific classification
- Domain: Eukaryota
- Kingdom: Animalia
- Phylum: Nematoda
- Class: Enoplea
- Order: Dorylaimida
- Family: Aetholaimidae

Family of roundworms

Aetholaimidae is a family of nematodes belonging to the order Dorylaimida.

Genera:

- Aetholaimus Williams, 1962
