= Nygolaimidae =

Scientific classification
- Kingdom: Animalia
- Phylum: Nematoda
- Class: Enoplea
- Order: Dorylaimida
- Family: Nygolaimidae

Genera
- See text

Family of nematodes

Nygolaimidae is a family of soft-bodied nematodes belonging to the order Dorylaimida. Some members of this family are found in terrestrial soil or fresh water habitats.

== Description ==
Genera and species of this family are about 1 to 7.3 millimeters in length. Most in this family are characterized by a thin cutical, smooth or fine striations, a spear-like non-protrusible mural tooth located on the left submedian wall of stoma, a basal portion of the esophagus surrounded by a thin sheath, strong spicules with males and short and blundy tails in both sexes.

== Genera ==
Genera:

- Afronygus Heyns, 1968
- Aporcelaimoides Heyns, 1965
- Laevides
- Aquatides Heyns, 1968
- Nygellus
- Paranygolaimus
- Paravulvus
- Solididens
