= Leptonchidae =

Scientific classification
- Domain: Eukaryota
- Kingdom: Animalia
- Phylum: Nematoda
- Class: Enoplea
- Order: Dorylaimida
- Family: Leptonchidae

Synonyms
- Basirotyleptidae; Belonenchidae; Tyleptidae

Family of nematodes

Leptonchidae is a family of nematodes belonging to the order Dorylaimida.

== Genera ==
Genera:

- Aculonchus Siddiqi, 1983
- Agmodorus Thorne, 1964
- Apoleptonchus Siddiqi, 1981
