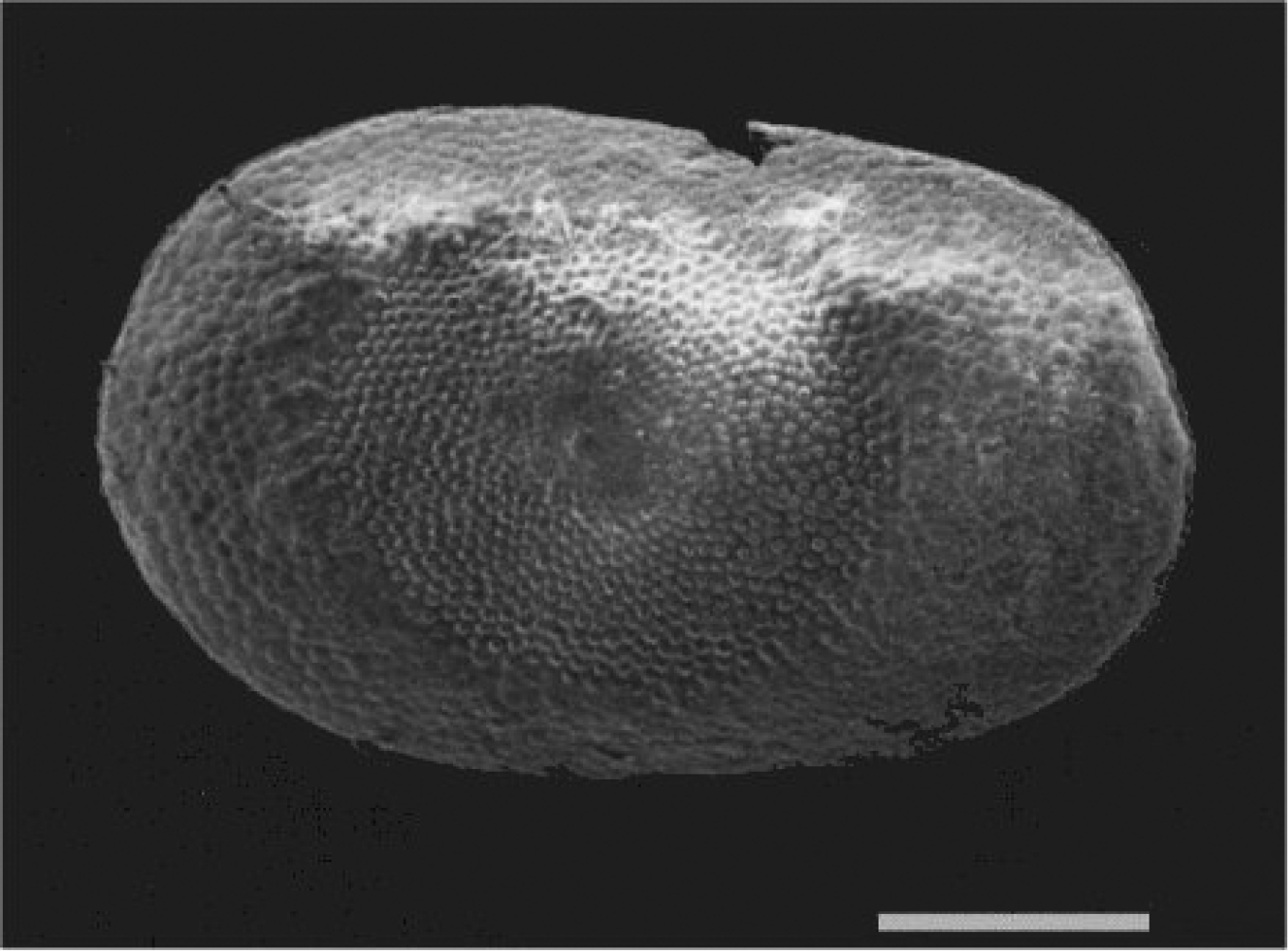
- Hyalinella punctata

Scientific classification
- Kingdom: Animalia
- Phylum: Bryozoa
- Class: Phylactolaemata
- Order: Plumatellida
- Family: Plumatellidae
- Genus: Hyalinella; Jullien, 1885

= Hyalinella (bryozoan) =

Genus of aquatic invertebrates

Hyalinella is a genus of bryozoans belonging to the family Plumatellidae.

The species of this genus are found in Europe, Northern America and Australia.

Species:

- Hyalinella africana Wiebach, 1964
- Hyalinella diwaniensis Rao, Agrawal, Diwan & Shrivastava, 1985
- Hyalinella lendenfeldi (Ridley, 1886)
- Hyalinella orbisperma (Kellicott, 1882)
- Hyalinella punctata (Hancock, 1850)
- Hyalinella vaihiriae Hastings, 1929
