= Aulolaimoididae =

Scientific classification
- Domain: Eukaryota
- Kingdom: Animalia
- Phylum: Nematoda
- Class: Enoplea
- Order: Dorylaimida
- Family: Aulolaimoididae

Family of roundworms

Aulolaimoididae is a family of nematodes belonging to the order Dorylaimida.

Genera:

- Adenolaimus Andrássy, 1973
- Cladocephalus Swart & Heyns, 1991
- Oostenbrinkia Ali, Suryawanshi & Ahmed, 1973
