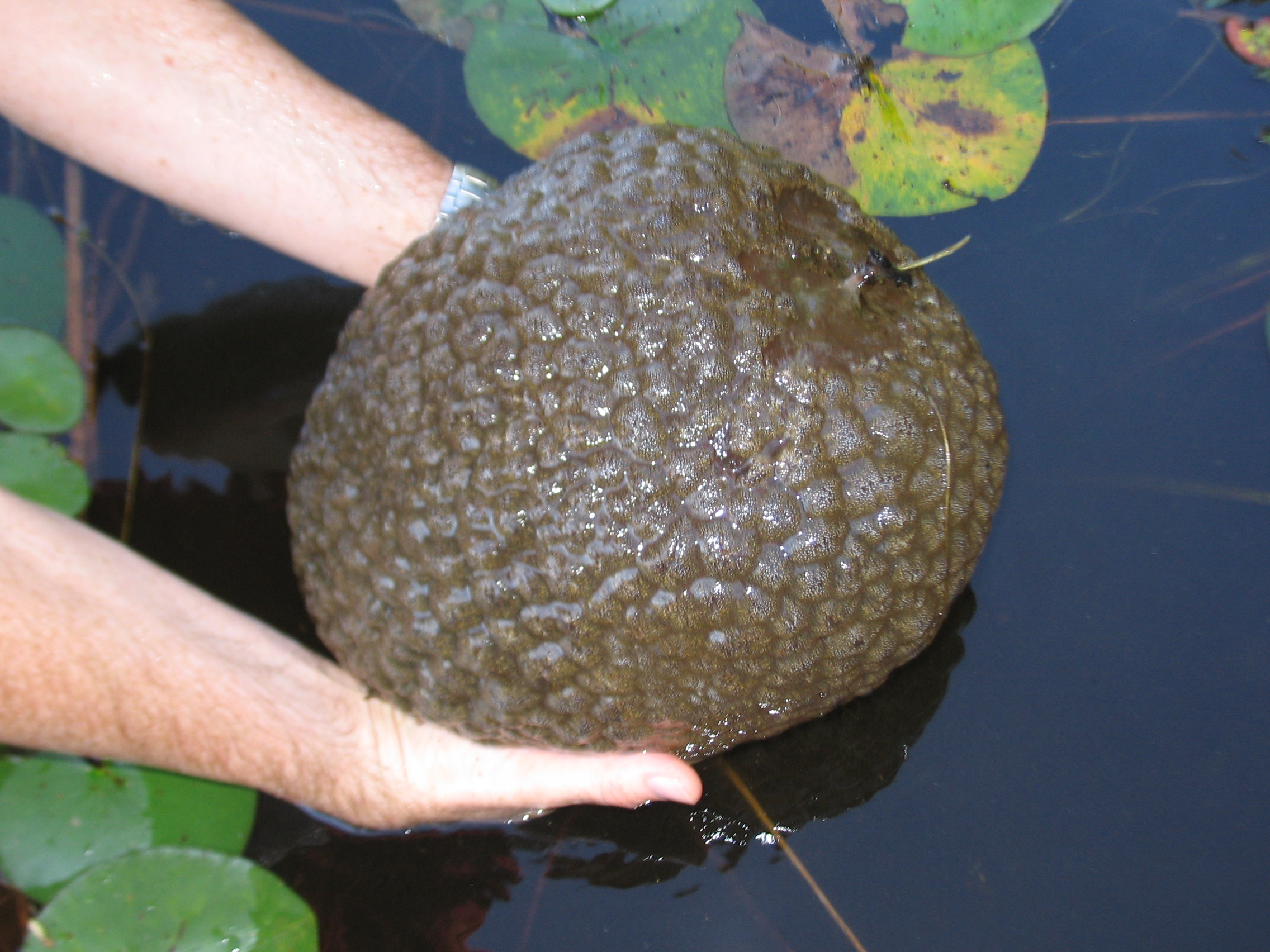
- Pectinatella magnifica

Scientific classification
- Kingdom: Animalia
- Phylum: Bryozoa
- Class: Phylactolaemata
- Order: Plumatellida
- Family: Pectinatellidae
- Genus: Pectinatella; Leidy, 1852

= Pectinatella =

Genus of aquatic invertebrates

Pectinatella is a genus of bryozoans belonging to the family Pectinatellidae. The species of this genus are found in Europe, East Asia, and Northern America.

== Species ==
There are one or two species:

- Pectinatella davenporti (Oka, 1907)
- Pectinatella magnifica (Leidy, 1851)
