= Mydonomidae =

Scientific classification
- Kingdom: Animalia
- Phylum: Nematoda
- Class: Enoplea
- Order: Dorylaimida
- Family: Mydonomidae

Synonyms
- Dorylaimoididae; Miranematidae

Family of roundworms

Mydonomidae is a family of nematodes belonging to the order Dorylaimida.

Genera:

- Calolaimus Timm, 1964
- Morasia Baqri & Jairajpuri, 1969
- Mydonomus Thorne, 1964
- Paratimmus Baniyamuddin & Ahmad, 2009
- Scalpenchus Siddiqi, 1995
- Timmus Goseco, Ferris & Ferris, 1976
