= Nygellidae =

Scientific classification
- Kingdom: Animalia
- Phylum: Nematoda
- Class: Enoplea
- Order: Dorylaimida
- Family: Nygellidae; Andrassy, 1958

Family of nematodes

Nygellidae is a family of nematodes belonging to the order Dorylaimida.

Genera:

- Nygellus Thorne, 1939
