= Tylencholaimidae =

Scientific classification
- Kingdom: Animalia
- Phylum: Nematoda
- Class: Enoplea
- Order: Dorylaimida
- Family: Tylencholaimidae

Family of nematodes

Tylencholaimidae is a family of nematodes belonging to the order Dorylaimida.

== Genera ==
Genera:

- Bullanema Sauer, 1968
- Chitwoodielloides Ahmad & Araki, 2003
- Chitwoodiellus Jimenez Guirado & Pea-Santiago, 1992
