= Nygolaimellidae =

Scientific classification
- Domain: Eukaryota
- Kingdom: Animalia
- Phylum: Nematoda
- Class: Enoplea
- Order: Dorylaimida
- Family: Nygolaimellidae

Family of nematodes

Nygolaimellidae is a family of nematodes belonging to the order Dorylaimida.

Genera:

- Nygolaimellus Loos, 1949
- Nygolaimium Thorne, 1930
- Scapidens Heyns, 1965
