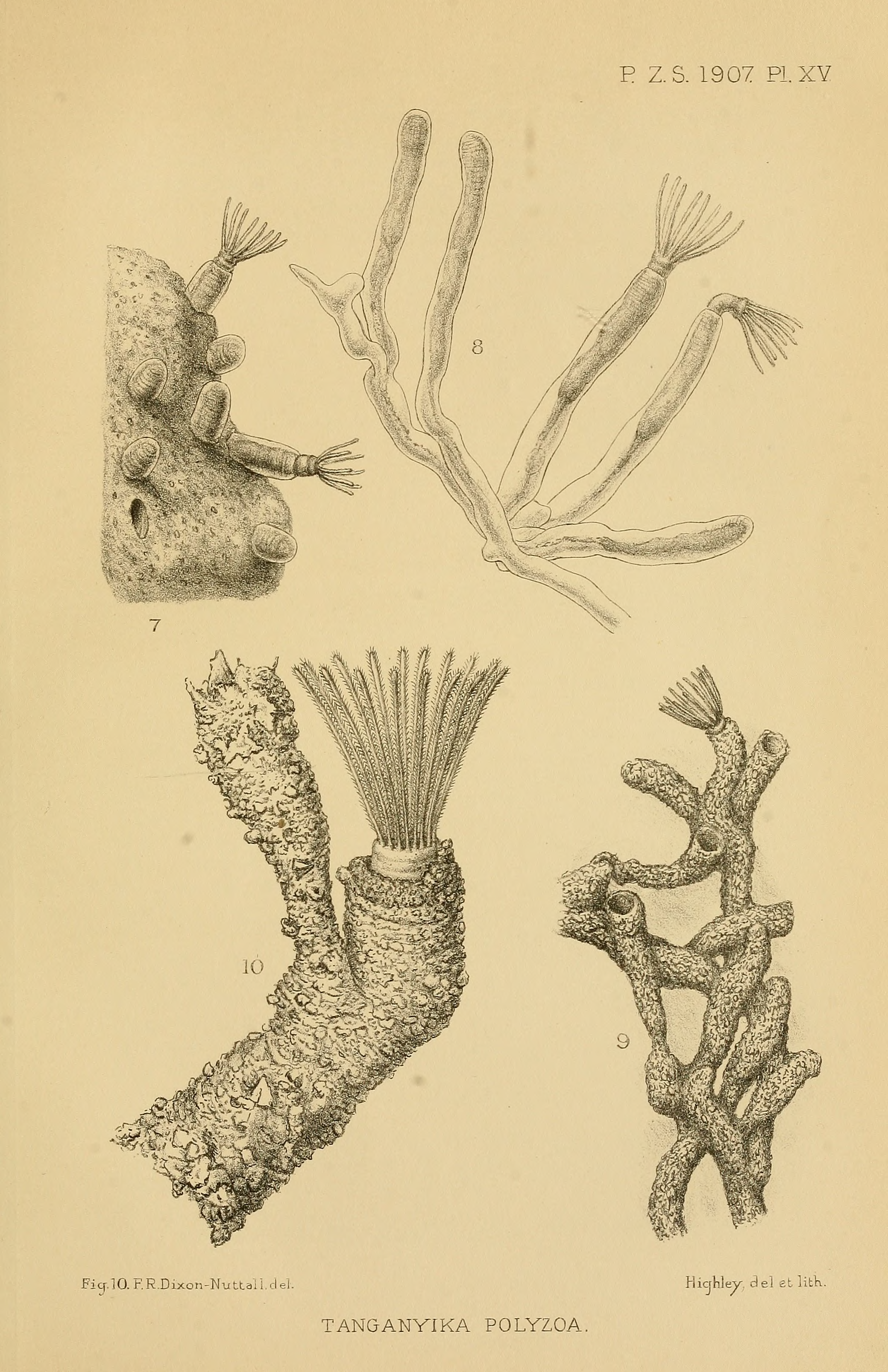

Scientific classification
- Kingdom: Animalia
- Phylum: Bryozoa
- Class: Phylactolaemata
- Order: Plumatellida
- Family: Fredericellidae

= Fredericellidae =

Family of bryozoans

Fredericellidae is a family of bryozoans belonging to the order Plumatellida.

Genera:

- Fredericella Gervais, 1838
- Internectella Gruncharova, 1971
