= Aporcelaimidae =

Scientific classification
- Kingdom: Animalia
- Phylum: Nematoda
- Class: Enoplea
- Order: Dorylaimida
- Suborder: Dorylaimina
- Superfamily: Dorylaimoidea
- Family: Aporcelaimidae

Family of roundworms

Aporcelaimidae is a family of nematodes belonging to the order Dorylaimida.

== Genera ==
Genera:

- Akrotonus Thorne, 1974
- Amblydorylaimus Andrassy, 1998
- Aporcedorus Jairajpuri & Ahmad, 1983
