= Centropyxiella =

Scientific classification
- Domain: Eukaryota
- Clade: Amorphea
- Phylum: Amoebozoa
- Class: Tubulinea
- Order: Arcellinida
- Family: Centropyxidae
- Genus: Centropyxiella; Valkanov, 1970

Species
- Centropyxiella arenaria Valkanov, 1970; Centropyxiella elegans Valkanov, 1970; Centropyxiella gibbula Valkanov, 1970; Centropyxiella gibbulina Chardez & Thomas, 1980; Centropyxiella golemanskyi Chardez, 1977; Centropyxiella lucida Golemansky, 1971; Centropyxiella oopyxiformis Chardez, 1977; Centropyxiella platystoma Golemansky, 1981

Genus of protozoans

Centropyxiella is a genus of Amoebozoa in the family Centropyxidae.
