= Nordiidae =

Scientific classification
- Domain: Eukaryota
- Kingdom: Animalia
- Phylum: Nematoda
- Class: Enoplea
- Order: Dorylaimida
- Suborder: Dorylaimina
- Superfamily: Dorylaimoidea
- Family: Nordiidae

Synonyms
- Kochinematidae; Pungentidae

Family of worms

Nordiidae is a family of nematodes belonging to the order Dorylaimida.

== Genera ==
Genera:

- Actinolaimoides Meyl, 1957
- Acunemella Andrássy, 2002
- Cephalodorylaimus Jairajpuri, 1967
- Dorydorella Andrássy, 1987
- Ecanema Ahmad & Shaheen, 2005
- Echinodorus Siddiqi, 1995
- Enchodeloides Elshishka, Lazarova, Radoslavov, Hristov & Peneva, 2017
- Enchodelus Ahmad & Jairajpuri, 1980
- Enchodelus Thorne, 1939
- Enchodorus Vinciguerra, 1976
- Kochinema Heyns, 1963
- Lanzavecchia Zullini, 1988
- Lenonchium Siddiqi, 1965
- Longidorella Thorne, 1939
- Malekus Thorne, 1974
- Oonaguntus Thorne, 1974
- Oriverutoides Ahmad & Sturhan, 2002
- Papuadorus Andrássy, 2009
- Pungentella Andrássy, 2009
- Pungentus Thorne & Swanger, 1936
- Rhyssocolpus Andrássy, 1971
- Saevadorella Siddiqi, 1982
- Stenodorylaimus Álvarez-Ortega & Peña-Santiago, 2011
- Thornedia Husain & Khan, 1965
