= Belondiridae =

Scientific classification
- Kingdom: Animalia
- Phylum: Nematoda
- Class: Enoplea
- Order: Dorylaimida
- Suborder: Dorylaimina
- Superfamily: Belondiroidea
- Family: Belondiridae

Synonyms
- Axonchiidae; Dorylaimellidae; Falcihastidae; Roqueidae; Swangeriidae

Family of roundworms

Belondiridae is a family of nematodes belonging to the order Dorylaimida. They are small to medium sized, being around 0.7-2 mm in length. There are 256 unique species scattered among 33 genera.

== Description ==
These nematodes are described as having short tails, that are rounded or conical.

== Genera ==
Genera:

- Amphibelondira Rahman, Jairajpuri, Ahmad & Ahmad, 1987
- Anchobelondira Nair & Coomans, 1971
- Axonchium Cobb, 1920
- Axonchoides Thorne, 1967
- Belaxelles Thorne, 1974
- Belondira Thorne, 1939
- Belondirella Thorne, 1964
- Bullaenema Sauer, 1968
- Dactyluraxonchium Coomans & Nair, 1975
- Dorylaimellus Cobb, 1913
- Durinemella Andrássy, 2009
- Falchiasta Clark, 1964
- Helicobelondira Yeates, 1973
- Heynsaxonchium Coomans & Nair, 1975
- Hulqus Siddiqi, 1982
- Immanigula Andrássy, 1991
- Laurophagus Nesterov, 1976
- Lindseyus Ferris & Ferris, 1973
- Metaxonchium Coomans & Nair, 1975
- Nimigula Andrassy, 1985
- Nygellolaimellus Dhanam & Jairajpuri, 1999
- Oxybelondira Ahmad & Jairajpuri, 1979
- Oxydirus Thorne, 1939
- Paraoxybelondira Dhanam & Shamim Jairajpuri, 1999
- Paraoxydirus Jairajpuri & Ahmad, 1979
- Paraqudsiella Siddiqi, 1981
- Phallaxonchium Jairajpuri & Dhanachand, 1979
- Probelondira Andrássy, 2009
- Qudsiella Jairajpuri, 1967
- Roqueus Thorne, 1964
- Swangeria Thorne, 1939
- Tarjanius Goseco & Ferris, 1980
- Yubdelus Khan, Azmi & Chawla, 1979

== Distribution ==
Species of Belondiridae are distributed on all 6 major continents, with major clusters being Europe, India, South Africa, and Western Australia.

== Sources ==
1. Belondiridae
2. Genus Belondira - Applied Nematology, Ecology and Acoustical Signatures
3. WoRMS - World Register of Marine Species - Belondiridae Thorne, 1939
4. New data of three rare belondirid species (Nematoda, Dorylaimida, Belondiridae) from Vietnam, with the first record and description of the male of Oxybelondira paraperplexa Ahmad & Jairajpuri, 1979
5. Description of five new and four known species of Dorylaimellus Cobb, 1913 with perioral disc (Nematoda: Belondiroidea) from the Western Ghats of India | European Journal of Taxonomy
