= Fredericella =

Scientific classification
- Kingdom: Animalia
- Phylum: Bryozoa
- Class: Phylactolaemata
- Order: Plumatellida
- Family: Fredericellidae
- Genus: Fredericella; Gervais, 1838

Genus of aquatic invertebrates

Fredericella is a genus of bryozoans belonging to the family Fredericellidae.

The genus has cosmopolitan distribution.

Species:

- Fredericella australiensis Goddard, 1909
- Fredericella browni Rogick, 1945
- Fredericella indica Annandale, 1909
- Fredericella sultana Blumenbach, 1779
- Fredericella tenax Wood & Okamura, 2017
- Fredericella toriumii Hirose & Mawatari, 2011
