= Tapajosella =

Scientific classification
- Kingdom: Animalia
- Phylum: Bryozoa
- Class: Phylactolaemata
- Order: Plumatellida
- Family: Tapajosellidae; Wood & Okamura, 2017
- Genus: Tapajosella; Wood & Okamura, 2017
- Species: T. elongata

Binomial name
- Tapajosella elongata Wood & Okamura, 2017

Genus of bryozoans

Tapajosella is a monotypic genus of bryozoans belonging to the monotypic family Tapajosellidae. The only species is Tapajosella elongata.

The species is found in Southern America.
