= Alaimidae =

Scientific classification
- Kingdom: Animalia
- Phylum: Nematoda
- Class: Enoplea
- Order: Dorylaimida
- Family: Alaimidae; Micoletzky, 1922

Type genus
- Alaimus de Man, 1880

Genera
- Adorus Thorne, 1939; Alaimus de Man, 1880; Amphidelus Thorne, 1939; Paramphidelus Andrássy, 1977; Pseudamphidelus Andrássy, 1977

Family of roundworms

Alaimidae is a family of free-living, bacterivorous nematodes belonging to the class Enoplea. The family is widely distributed in terrestrial, moss, and freshwater habitats worldwide.

== Description ==
Members of Alaimidae are typically small to medium-sized nematodes characterized by extremely slender, cylindrical bodies and a smooth or exceedingly finely striated cuticle.

Diagnostic morphological characteristics include:

- Head and amphids: The labial region is smooth and continuous with the body contour. Amphidial apertures are unusually positioned, often situated far posterior to the lip region, appearing as minute pores or transverse slits with tubular pouches.
- Stoma: The stoma (mouth cavity) is vestigial, extremely reduced, or absent, lacking any teeth, jaws, or stylets (such as the odontostyle found in typical Dorylaimida).
- Pharynx: The pharynx is slender anteriorly and expands gradually in its posterior third to half, lacking a distinct muscular bulb or valves.
- Reproductive system: Females generally possess one or two reflexed ovaries (monodelphic or didelphic). Males have simple, paired spicules; gubernaculum is typically absent, and precloacal supplementary organs are either rudimentary or lacking.

== Ecology and feeding ==
Alaimids are primarily bacterivores that inhabit soil pore water, decaying organic matter, rhizosphere environments, and freshwater sediments. Because they lack feeding armature such as spears or crushing teeth, they ingest bacteria and small unicellular particles via suction generated by the muscular posterior pharynx.

== Taxonomy ==
The family was established by Heinrich Micoletzky in 1922. Historically, Alaimidae was placed within the order Dorylaimida due to pharyngeal morphology. Modern morphological and molecular phylogenetic classifications frequently place Alaimidae within the order Enoplida (suborder Alaimina or superfamily Alaimoidea), or treat Alaimida as a distinct order within Enoplia.

=== Genera ===
The family contains the following genera:

- Adorus Thorne, 1939
- Alaimus de Man, 1880
- Amphidelus Thorne, 1939
- Paramphidelus Andrássy, 1977
- Pseudamphidelus Andrássy, 1977
