= Actinolaimidae =

Scientific classification
- Domain: Eukaryota
- Kingdom: Animalia
- Phylum: Nematoda
- Class: Enoplea
- Order: Dorylaimida
- Suborder: Dorylaimina
- Superfamily: Dorylaimoidea
- Family: Actinolaimidae

Synonyms
- Brittonematidae; Neoactinolaimidae; Paractinolaimidae

Family of roundworms

Actinolaimidae is a family of nematodes belonging to the order Dorylaimida.

== Genera ==
Genera:

- Actinca Andrássy, 1964
- Actinolaimoides Meyl, 1957
- Actinolaimus Cobb, 1913
