= Stephanella =

Scientific classification
- Kingdom: Animalia
- Phylum: Bryozoa
- Class: Phylactolaemata
- Order: Plumatellida
- Family: Stephanellidae; Lacourt, 1968
- Genus: Stephanella; Oka, 1908

Genus of bryozoans

Stephanella is a genus of bryozoans belonging to the monotypic family Stephanellidae.

The species of this genus are found in Northern America.

Species:

- Stephanella continentalis Vinogradov, 1995
- Stephanella hina Oka, 1908
- Stephanella trichopterina Vinogradov, 1995
