= Lophopodidae =

Scientific classification
- Kingdom: Animalia
- Phylum: Bryozoa
- Class: Phylactolaemata
- Order: Plumatellida
- Family: Lophopodidae

Family of bryozoans

Lophopodidae is a family of bryozoans belonging to the order Plumatellida.

Genera:

- Asajirella Oda & Mukai, 1989
- Lophopodella Rousselet, 1904
- Lophopus Dumortier, 1835
