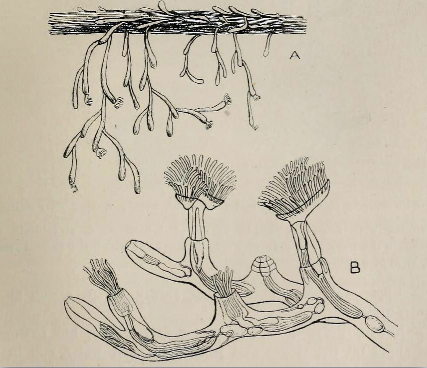
- Plumatella repens; A. partly free, partly incrusting a stem of a water weed B. Cells magnified

Scientific classification
- Kingdom: Animalia
- Phylum: Bryozoa
- Class: Phylactolaemata
- Order: Plumatellida
- Family: Plumatellidae
- Genus: Plumatella

Synonyms
- Afrindella Wiebach, 1964

= Plumatella =

Genus of moss animals

Plumatella is a genus of bryozoans from family Plumatellidae.

== Species ==
Species:

- Plumatella agilis
- Plumatella bigemmis
- Plumatella bushnelli
- Plumatella casmiana
- Plumatella crassipes
- Plumatella emarginata
- Plumatella fruticosa
- Plumatella fungosa
- Plumatella ganapati
- Plumatella geimermassardi
- Plumatella incrustata
- Plumatella javanica
- Plumatella longa
- Plumatella longigemmis
- Plumatella marcusi
- Plumatella marlieri
- Plumatella mukaii
- Plumatella nitens
- Plumatella nodulosa
- Plumatella patagonica
- Plumatella princeps
- Plumatella pseudostolonata
- Plumatella recluse
- Plumatella repens
- Plumatella reticulata
- Plumatella rieki
- Plumatella ruandensis
- Plumatella serrulata
- Plumatella similirepens
- Plumatella siolii
- Plumatella stricta
- Plumatella suwana
- Plumatella tanganyikae
- Plumatella vaihiriae
- Plumatella velata
- Plumatella vorstmani
