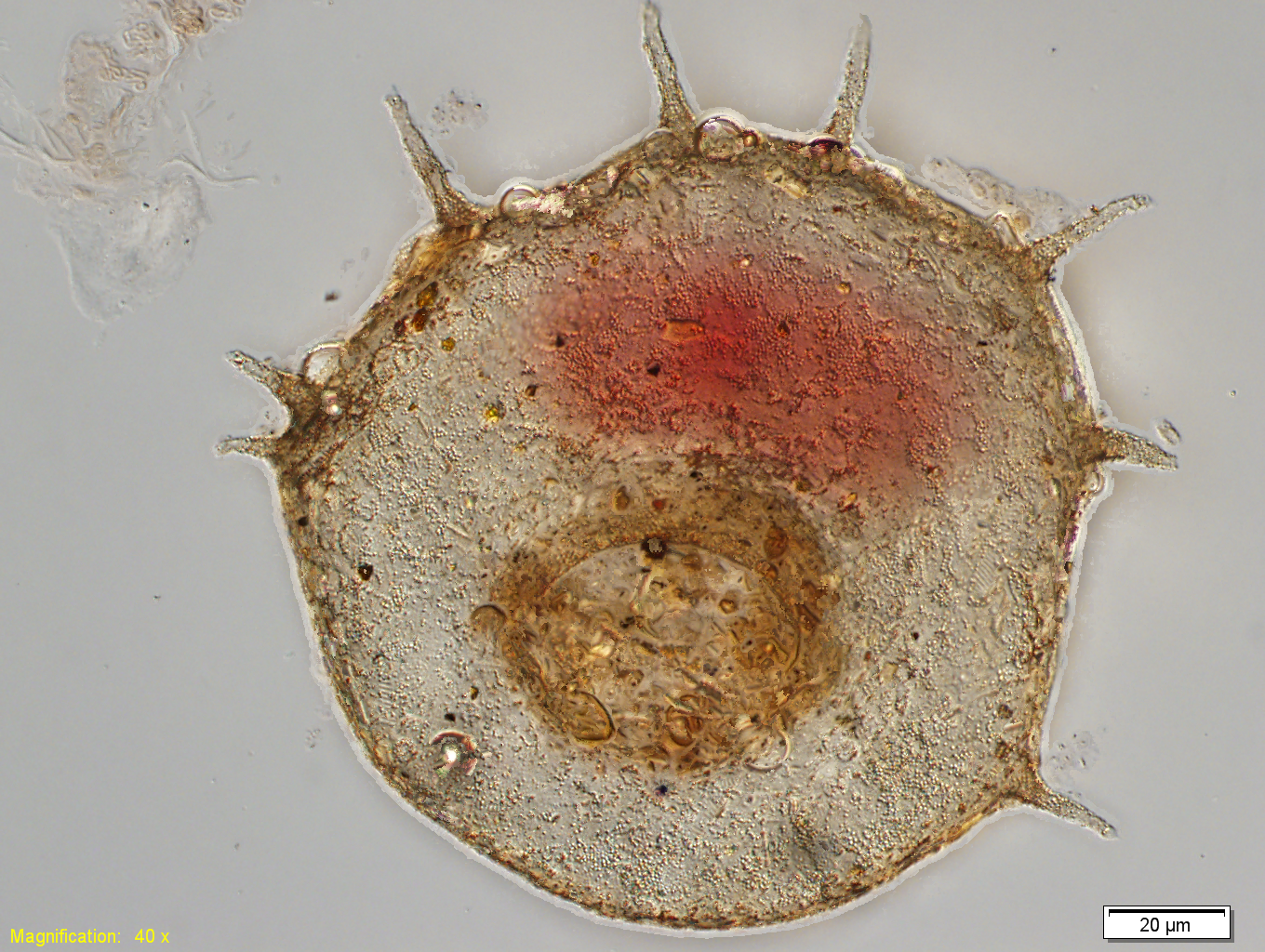
- Centropyxis aculeata

Scientific classification
- Domain: Eukaryota
- Clade: Amorphea
- Phylum: Amoebozoa
- Class: Tubulinea
- Order: Arcellinida
- Family: Centropyxidae
- Genus: Centropyxis; Stein, 1857

Species
- Centropyxis aculeata (Ehrenberg, 1832) Stein, 1859; Centropyxis aerophila Deflandre, 1929; Centropyxis constricta (Ehrenberg, 1841) Deflandre, 1929; Centropyxis minuta Deflandre, 1929; Centropyxis platystoma (Penard, 1890) Deflandre, 1929

= Centropyxis =

Genus of amoebae

Centropyxis is a genus of lobose testate amoebae (Amoebozoa), including the species Centropyxis aculeata.
