= Scutariellidae =

Scientific classification
- Kingdom: Animalia
- Phylum: Platyhelminthes
- Order: Rhabdocoela
- Family: Scutariellidae

Family of flatworms

Scutariellidae is a family of flatworms belonging to the order Rhabdocoela.

Genera:

- Bubalocerus Matjasic, 1958
- Caradinicola Annandale, 1912
- Caridinicola Annandale, 1912
- Cercomeria
- Monodiscus Plate, 1914
- Paracaridinicola Baer, 1953
- Scutariella Mrazek, 1907
- Stygodycticola Matjasic, 1958
- Stygodyticola Matjasic, 1958
- Subtelsonia Matjasic, 1958
- Troglocaridicola Matjasic, 1958
