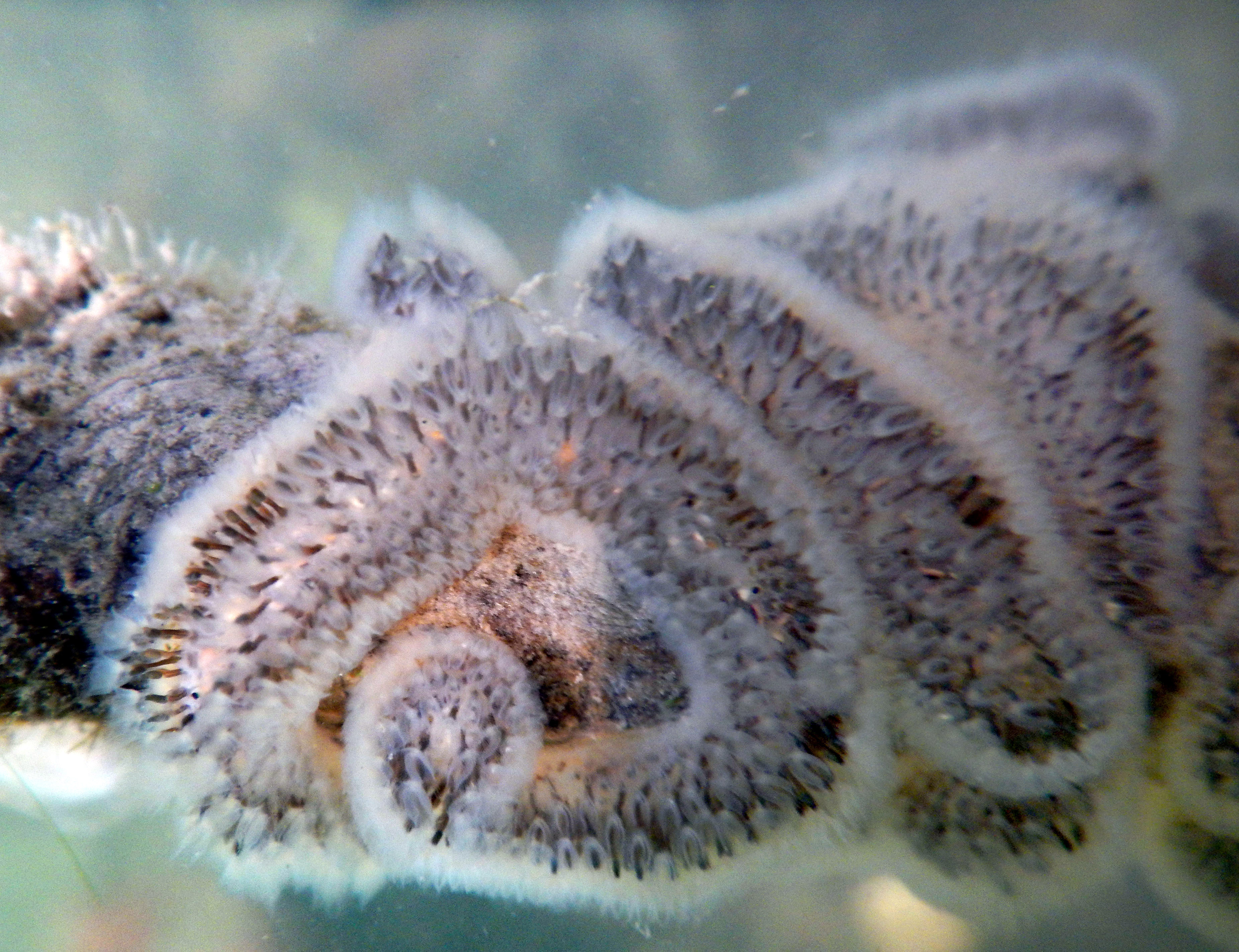

Scientific classification
- Kingdom: Animalia
- Phylum: Bryozoa
- Class: Phylactolaemata
- Order: Plumatellida
- Family: Cristatellidae; Allman, 1856
- Genus: Cristatella; Cuvier, 1798
- Species: C. mucedo

Binomial name
- Cristatella mucedo Cuvier, 1798

= Cristatella =

Genus of moss animals

Cristatella mucedo is a bryozoan in the family Cristatellidae, and the only species of the genus Cristatella. They are noted for their elongated shape and colorless, transparent bodies.

== Distribution ==
The species can be found in north-eastern North America (Canada, and United States), Northern Europe, including United Kingdom, Lithuania, Norway, Finland, and the Netherlands from sea level to 1,116 metres (3,661 ft) asl.

== Habitat and ecology ==
The species prefers cold climate waters. They live in statoblastic colonies that can range from 5 to 10 centimeters. The habitat is either lotic or lentic, including man-made water bodies such as gravel pits.

Populations in Europe are genetically relatively homogeneous, perhaps reflecting postglacial colonization representing a single lineage. In contrast, North American populations are highly diverse. There is some evidence of two different major lineages, perhaps representing cryptic species or subspecies, with hybridization that have boosted genetic diversity. Some colonies have shown capabilities in sexual reproduction in brief instances.

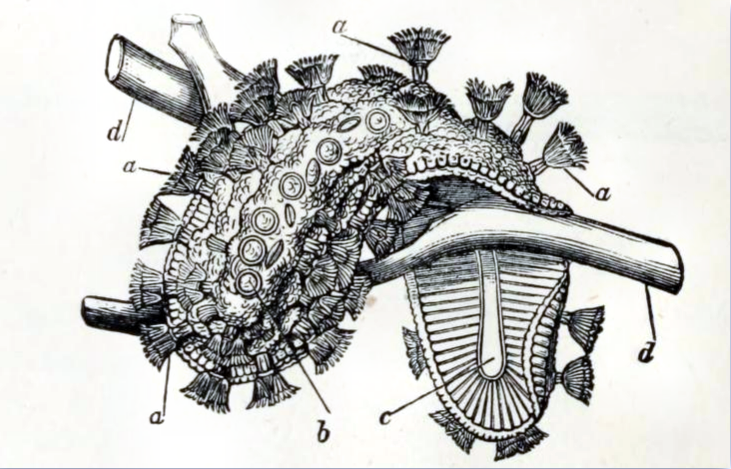
Cristatella mucedo creeping over a stem of water weed; a) polypides with horseshoe-shaped crown of tentacles b) statoblasts seen through the tissues c) muscular sole by means of which the animal creeps d) stem of water weed
