= Almidae =

Scientific classification
- Domain: Eukaryota
- Kingdom: Animalia
- Phylum: Annelida
- Clade: Pleistoannelida
- Clade: Sedentaria
- Class: Clitellata
- Order: Opisthopora
- Family: Almidae

Genera
- Alma; Callidrilus; Drilocrius; Glyphidrilocrius; Glyphidrilus

Family of annelid worms

The animal family Almidae includes about six genera of segmented worms.

A notable peculiarity of some species in this family is a tendency to extensions of the body wall in the vicinity of or including the male pores. These extensions may be mere protuberances, as in some species of Drilocrius; or involve a greater extent of the body wall, as in genus Glyphidrilocrius. They take the form of wing or keel-like structures called alae in Glyphidrilus species and paddle-shaped claspers in Drilocrius alfari.

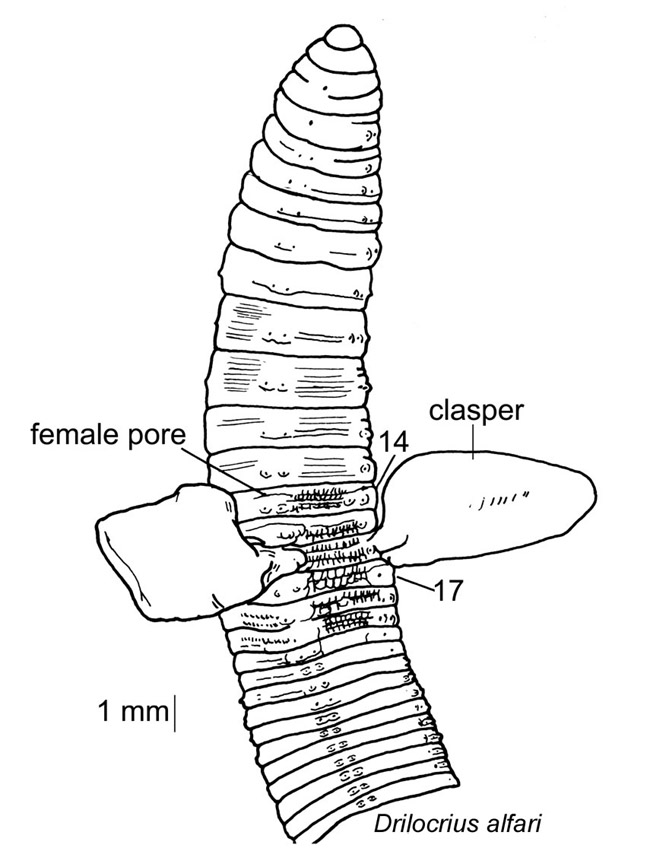
The winglike claspers of Drilocrius alfari

All species of genus Alma have claspers. The male pores are near the tips of these claspers, and they are furnished with genital chaetae and sucker-like structures.

Most members of this family have one pair of male pores on segment 15 through 30. Female pores are located on segment 14. Glyphidrilus kukenthali is one of only three ‘earthworm’ species known to have two pairs of female pores, in 13 and 14.

A possibly related family, Criodrilidae, contains genera Criodrilus and Biwadrilus with male pores in 15 and 13, respectively. Spermathecae are absent (a rare condition in oligochaetes) and one to several spermatophores containing the sperm are transferred between partners and attached near the genital field.
