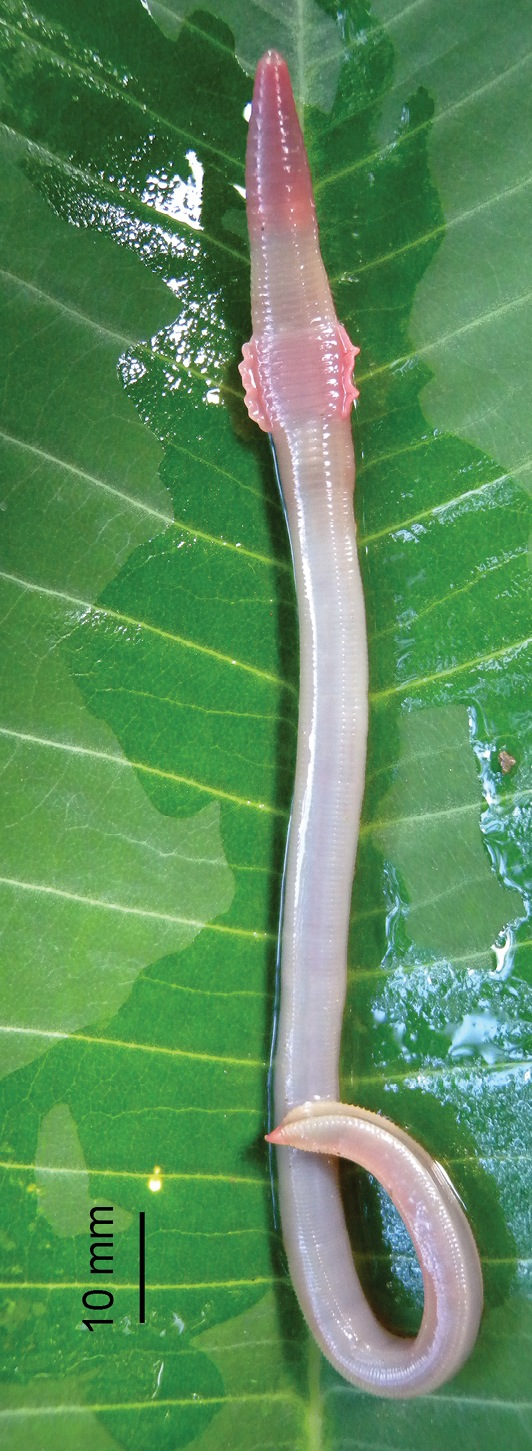
- Glyphidrilus sp.
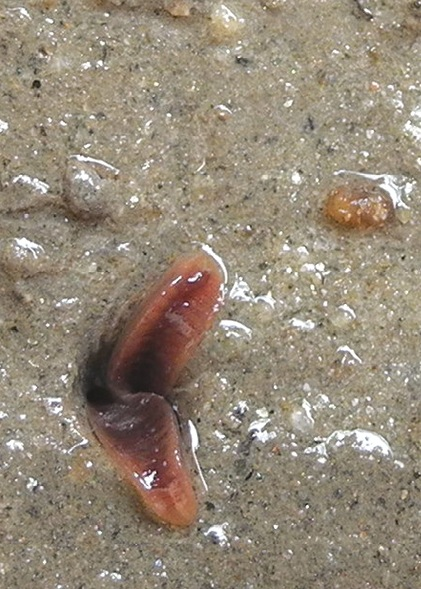
- Exposed tail tips of a Glyphidrilus individual

Scientific classification
- Kingdom: Animalia
- Phylum: Annelida
- Clade: Pleistoannelida
- Clade: Sedentaria
- Class: Clitellata
- Order: Opisthopora
- Family: Almidae
- Genus: Glyphidrilus; Horst, 1889

Synonyms
- Bilimba Rosa, 1890

= Glyphidrilus =

Genus of annelids

Glyphidrilus is a genus of semi-aquatic freshwater earthworms in the family Almidae. It inhabits freshwater systems like river banks, lakes and rice fields from East Africa to South and South East Asia.

== Gallery ==
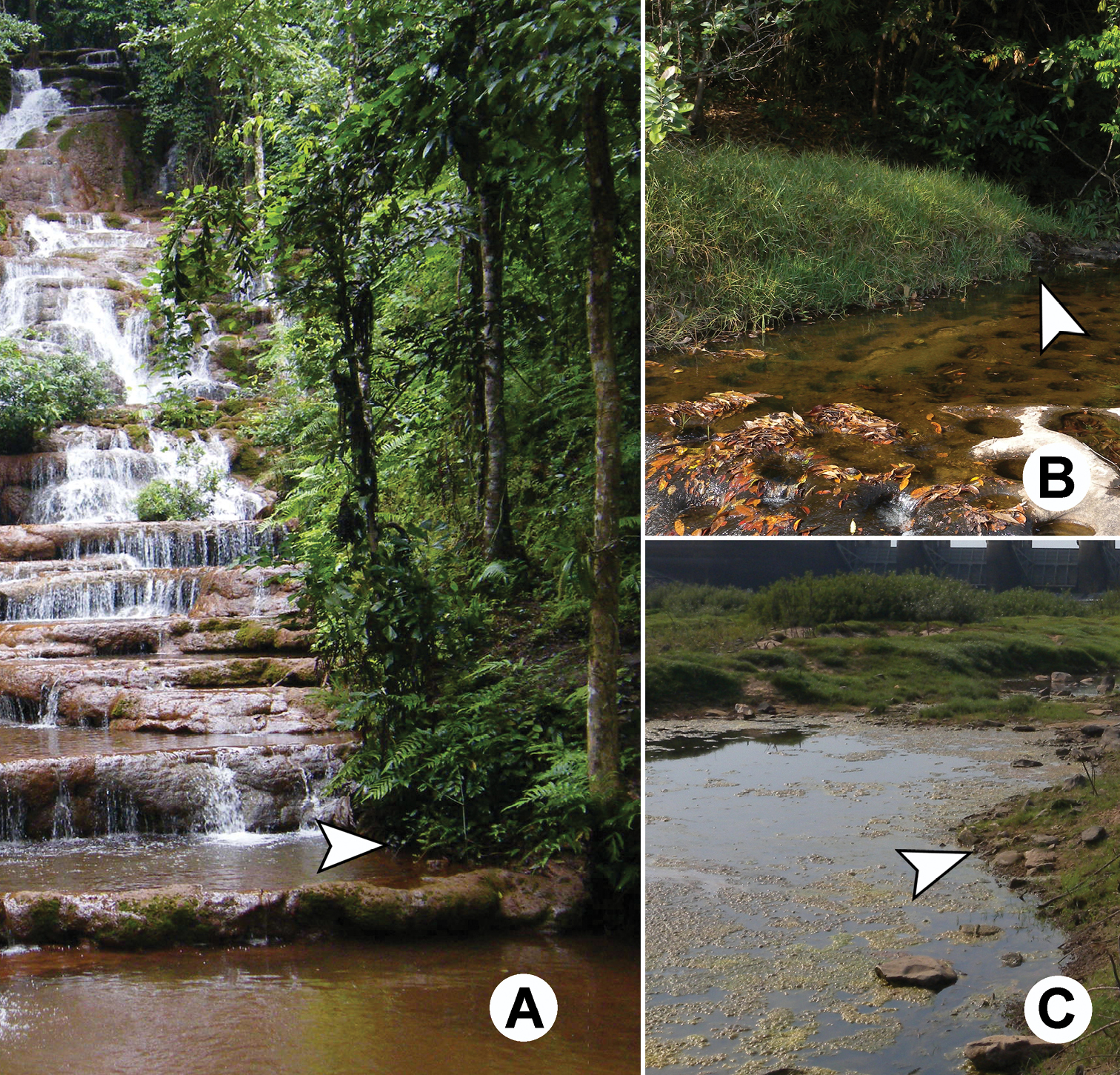
Typical habitat types of Glyphidrilus: waterfalls (A and B) and streams (C).

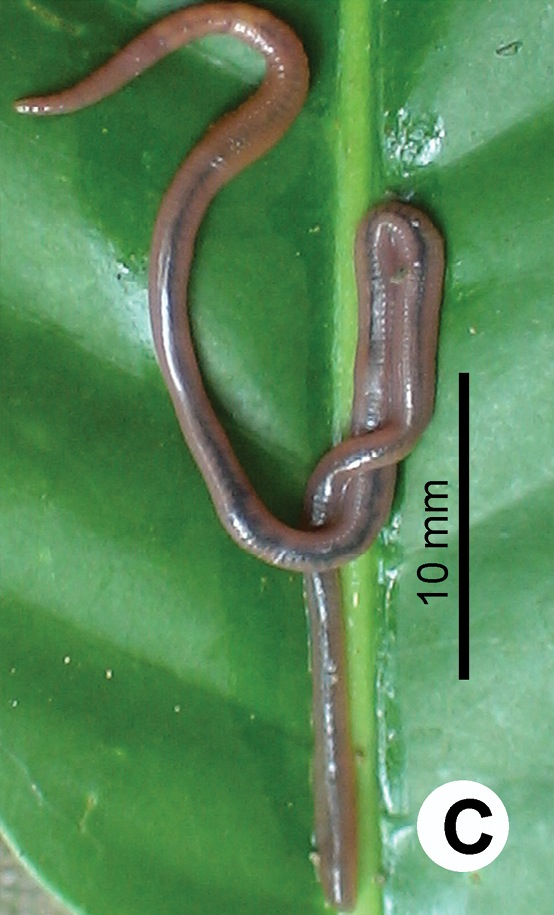
Glyphidrilus huailuangensis

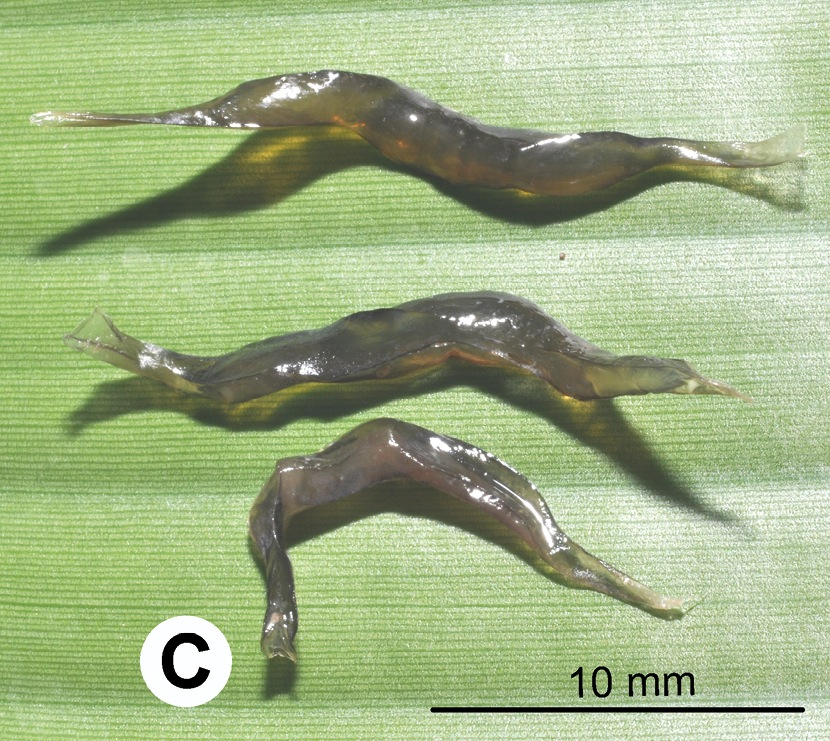
Glyphidrilus cocoons.

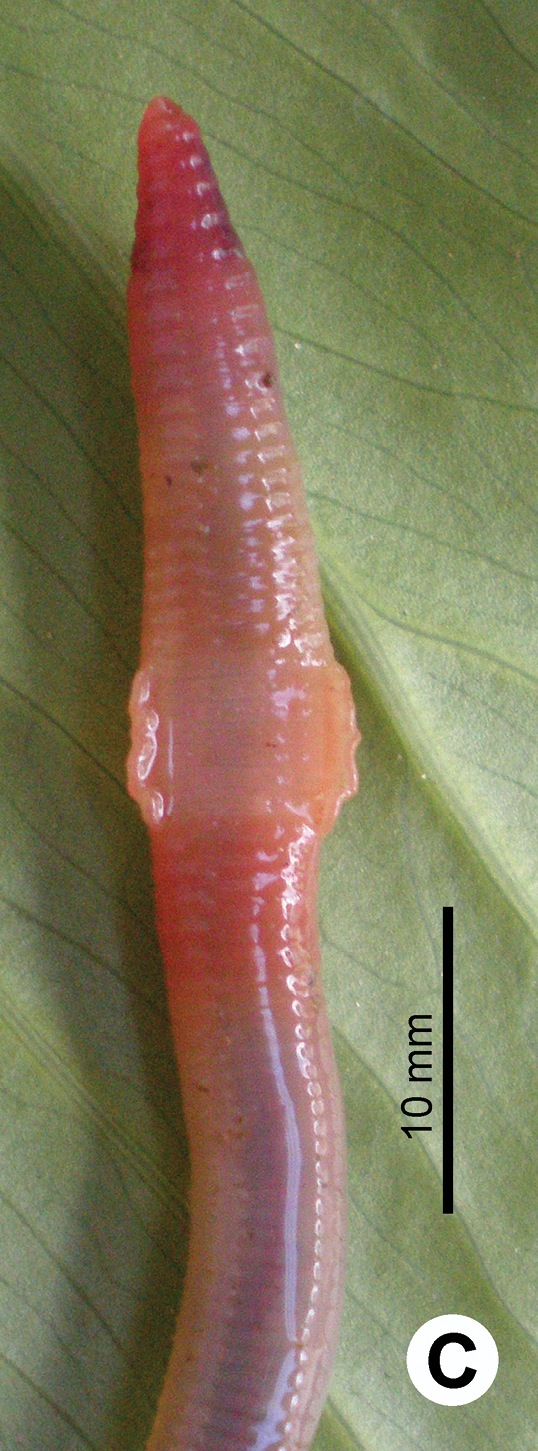
Glyphidrilus borealis
