= Statoblast =

Type of asexual reproduction in bryozoans

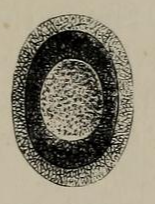
Statoblast of Plumatella repens

Statoblasts are a means to reproduce asexually by a method that is unique among bryozoans and enables a colony's lineage to survive the variable and uncertain conditions of fresh water environments. Statoblasts are masses of cells that function as "survival pods" rather like the gemmules of sponges. Statoblasts form on the funiculus (cord) connected to the parent's gut, which nourishes them. As they grow, statoblasts develop protective bivalve-like shells made of chitin. When they mature, some types stick to the parent colony, some fall to the bottom, some contain air spaces that enable them to float, and some remain in the parent's cystid (outer casing) to re-build the colony if it dies. Statoblasts can remain dormant for considerable periods, and while dormant can survive harsh conditions such as freezing and desiccation. They can be transported across long distances by animals, floating vegetation, currents and winds. When conditions improve, the valves of the shell separate and the cells inside develop into a zooid that tries to form a new colony. A study estimated that one group of colonies in a patch 1 square meter (11 sq ft) produced 800,000 statoblasts.

== Gallery ==
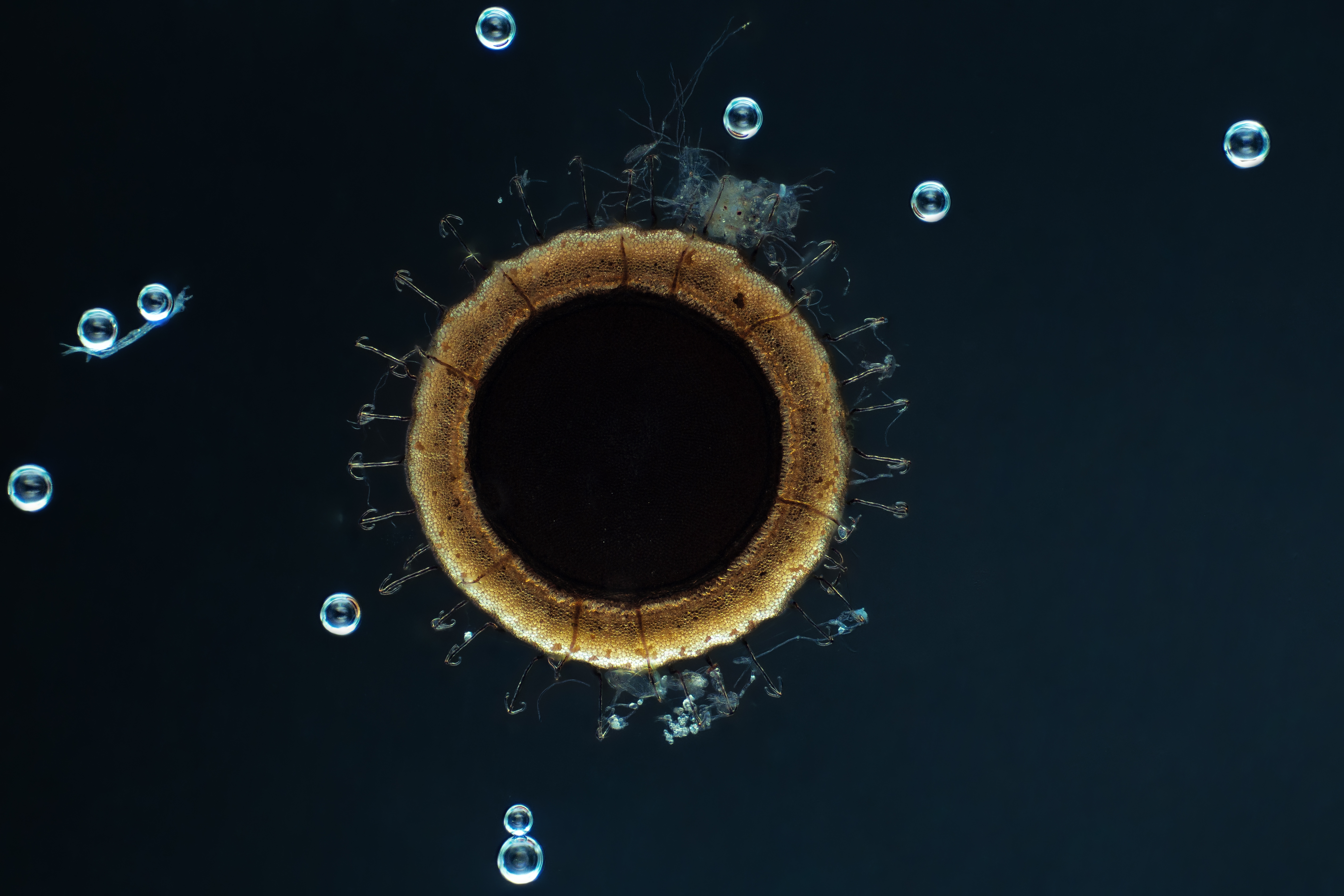
Cristatella

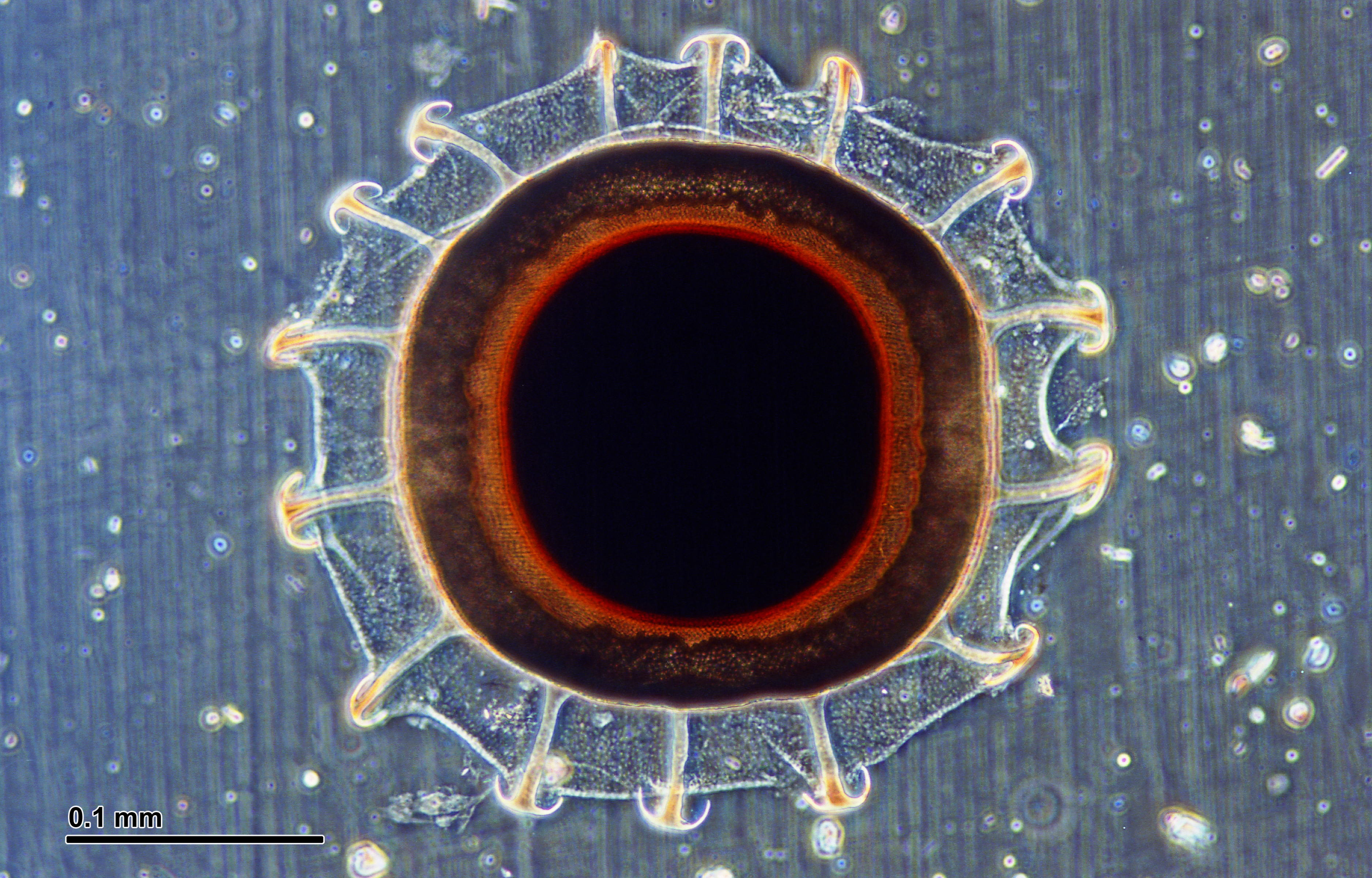
Pectinatella
