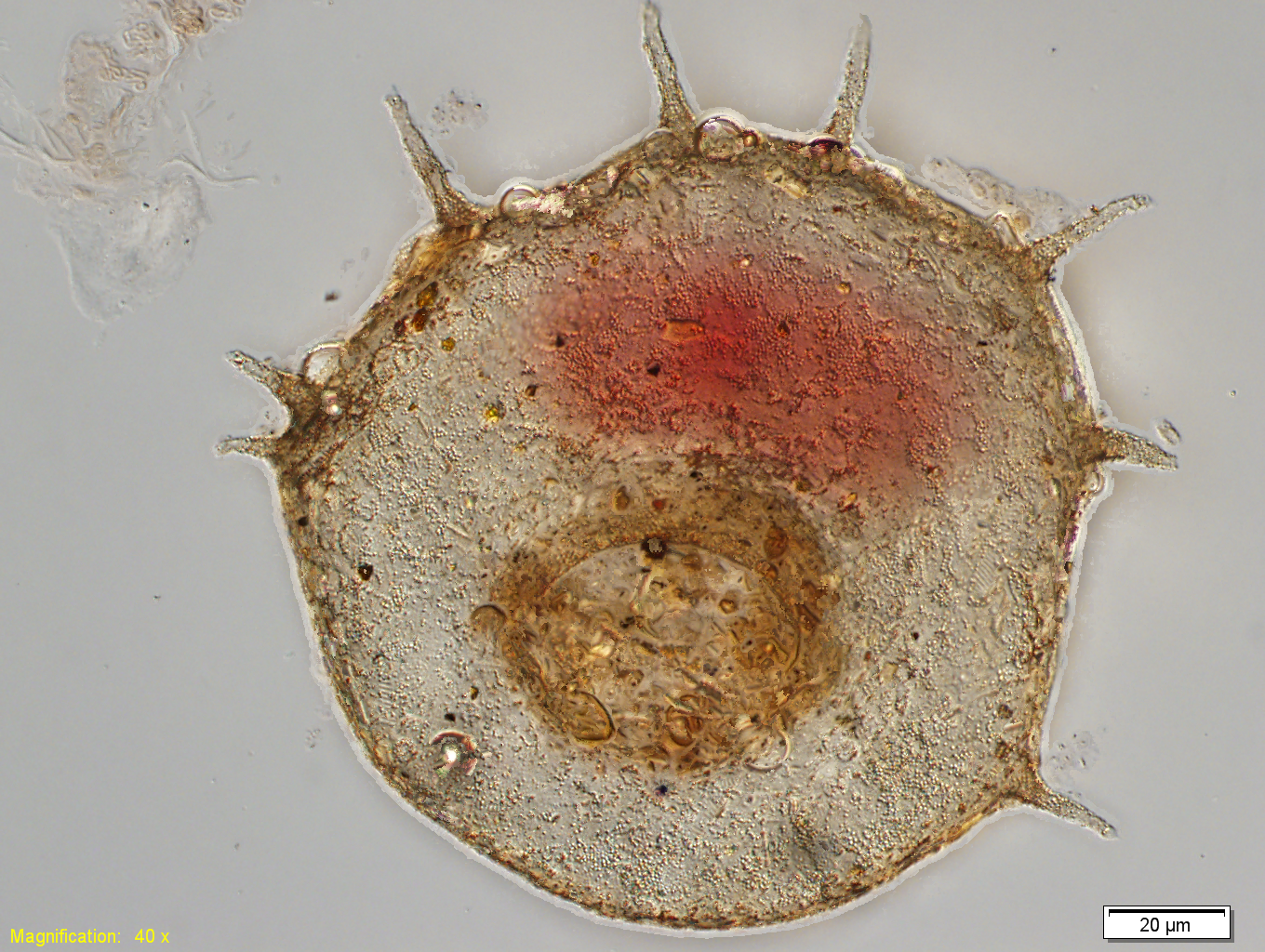
- Centropyxis aculeata

Scientific classification
- Domain: Eukaryota
- Clade: Amorphea
- Phylum: Amoebozoa
- Class: Tubulinea
- Order: Arcellinida
- Family: Centropyxidae; Jung, 1942

Genera
- Centropyxiella Valkanov, 1970; Centropyxis Stein, 1857; Proplagiopyxis

= Centropyxidae =

Family of protozoans

Centropyxidae is a family of Amoebozoa.
