= Dorylaimidae =

Scientific classification
- Kingdom: Animalia
- Phylum: Nematoda
- Class: Enoplea
- Order: Dorylaimida
- Suborder: Dorylaimina
- Superfamily: Dorylaimoidea
- Family: Dorylaimidae

Synonyms
- Arctidorylaimidae; Prodorylaimidae

Family of roundworms

Dorylaimidae is a family of nematodes, belonging to the order Dorylaimida.

== Genera ==
Genera:

- Afrodorylaimus Andrássy, 1964
- Amphidorylaimus Andrássy, 1960
- Anadorella Siddiqi, 2005
