= Qudsianematidae =

Scientific classification
- Kingdom: Animalia
- Phylum: Nematoda
- Class: Enoplea
- Order: Dorylaimida
- Suborder: Dorylaimina
- Superfamily: Dorylaimoidea
- Family: Qudsianematidae

Synonyms
- Chrysonematidae; Crateronematidae; Quadsianematidae

Family of nematodes

Qudsianematidae is a family of nematodes belonging to the order Dorylaimida.

== Genera ==
Genera:

- Allodorylaimus Andrássy, 1986
- Arctidorylaimus Mulvey & Anderson, 1979
- Baqriella Ahmed & Shamim Jairajpuri, 1988
