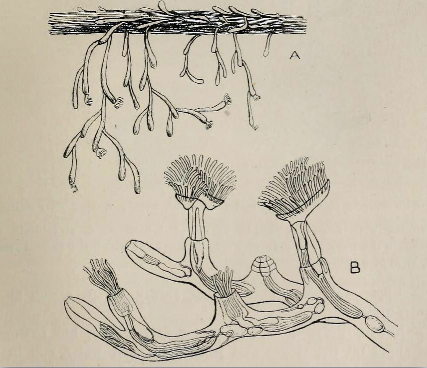
- Plumatella

Scientific classification
- Kingdom: Animalia
- Phylum: Bryozoa
- Class: Phylactolaemata
- Order: Plumatellida
- Family: Plumatellidae

= Plumatellidae =

Family of bryozoans

Plumatellidae is a family of bryozoans belonging to the order Plumatellida.

Genera:

- Australella
- Gelatinella Toriumi, 1955
- Hyalinella Jullien, 1885
- Leptoblastella Vinogradov, 2004
- Plumatella Lamarck, 1816
- Plumatellites Frič, 1901
- Rumarcanella Hirose & Mawatari, 2011
- Stolella Annandale, 1909
- Swarupella Shrivastava, 1981
