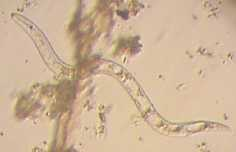
- Picture of a roundworm taken from wet soil. The front of the worm is on the left, and the dark line visible at the end is its feeding apparatus, known as a stylet.

Scientific classification
- Kingdom: Animalia
- Phylum: Nematoda
- Class: Enoplea
- Subclass: Dorylaimia
- Order: Dorylaimida; Pearse, 1942

Suborder
- See text

= Dorylaimida =

Order of roundworms

Dorylaimida (dorylaims) is a diverse order of nematodes with both soil and freshwater species.

== Taxonomy ==
=== History ===
The order originated with the description of Dorylaimus stagnalis by Dujardin in 1845, and in 1876 De MAn proposed the family Dorylamidae, while Cobb added many other genera and subgenera. In 1927 Filipjev added a subfamily, Dorylaiminae, and by 1934 there were four subfamilies. That was when Thorne raised family Dorylaimidae to superfamily Dorylaimoidea. In 1936 Pearse raised it further to become a suborder of Enoplida, and in 1942 Pearse proposed the current order, Dorylaimida to encompass all of the dorylaim nematodes. Many reorganisations followed. For instance Clark (1961) did not accept Dorylaimida, whereas Goodey (1963) did. Other reclassifications include Jairajpuri (1964, 1969, 1976, 1980, 1983, 1992), Thorne (1964, 1967), Siddiqui (1968, 1983), Andrássy (1969, 1976), and Coomans and Loof (1970). The scheme shown here is that of Jairajpuri (1992), which excludes the mononchs, alaims (Alaimida) and diphtherophorids (Triplonchida).

With the advent of molecular phylogenetic analysis, a further reorganisation has been necessary.

=== Subdivision ===
The families of order Dorylaimida are divided into three suborders and a number of superfamilies:

- Suborder Dorylaimina Pearse, 1942 (Type Suborder)
  - Superfamily Dorylaimoidea de Man, 1876
    - Family Actinolaimidae
    - Family Aporcelaimidae
    - Family Dorylaimidae
    - Family Longidoridae
    - Family Nordiidae
    - Family Qudsianematidae
  - Superfamily Belondiroidea Throne, 1939
    - Family Belondiridae
  - Superfamily Tylencholaimoidea Filipjev, 1934
    - Family Aulolaimoididae
    - Family Leptonchidae
    - Family Mydonomidae
    - Family Tylencholaimidae
- Suborder Nygolaimina Thorne, 1935
  - Superfamily Nygolaimoidea
    - Family Aetholaimidae
    - Family Nygellidae
    - Family Nygolaimellidae
    - Family Nygolaimidae
- Suborder Campydorina Jairajpuri, 1983
  - Superfamily Campydoroidea
    - Family Campydoroidae

== Bibliography ==
- Lee, Donald L, ed. (2010). The biology of nematodes. London: Taylor & Francis. ISBN 978-0415272117.
- Ahmad, Wasim; Jairajpuri, M. Shamim (1992). Dorylaimida : free-living, predaceous and plant-parasitic Nematodes. Leiden: E.J. Brill. ISBN 9004092293.
