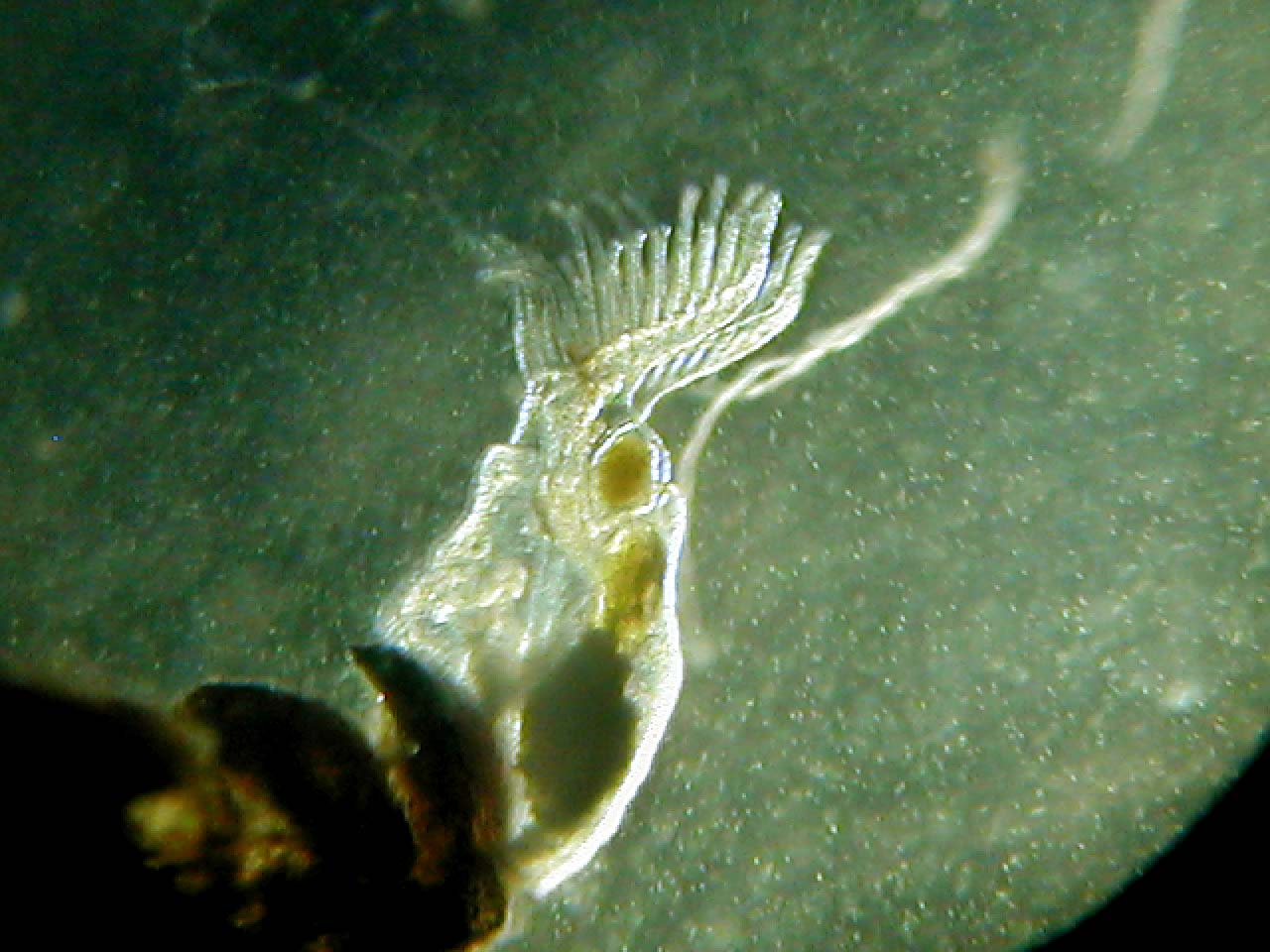
- Zooid of a Phylactoaemata colony

Scientific classification
- Kingdom: Animalia
- Phylum: Bryozoa
- Class: Phylactolaemata; Allman, 1856
- Order: Plumatellida

Families
- Cristatellidae; Fredericellidae; Lophopodidae; Pectinatellidae; Plumatellidae; Stephanellidae; Tapajosellidae

= Phylactolaemata =

Order of moss animals

Phylactolaemata is a class of the phylum Bryozoa whose members live only in freshwater environments. Like all bryozoans, they filter feed by means of an extensible "crown" of ciliated tentacles called a lophophore, and like nearly all bryozoans (the only known exception being Monobryozoon), they live in colonies, each of which consists of clones of the founding member. Unlike those of some marine bryozoans, phylactolaemate colonies consist of only one type of zooid, the feeding forms known as autozooids. These are supported by an unmineralized "exoskeleton" made of gelatinous material or protein, secreted by the zooids. The class contains only one extant order, Plumatellida.

== Fossil record ==
Phylactolaemata is regarded to have been the earliest group of bryozoans to evolve. However, because they did not have calcified skeletons, these early bryozoans would have had very low potential to fossilize. Fossils of phylactolaemate statoblasts, which consist of protective chitinous shells that serve as protection for dormant masses of cells holding the potential to grow new colonies, have been found rarely, dating back to the Permian. It is possible that the absence of statoblasts in earlier rocks is because statoblasts evolved as an adaptation for surviving in freshwater, and earlier phylactolaemates were marine.

== Biology ==
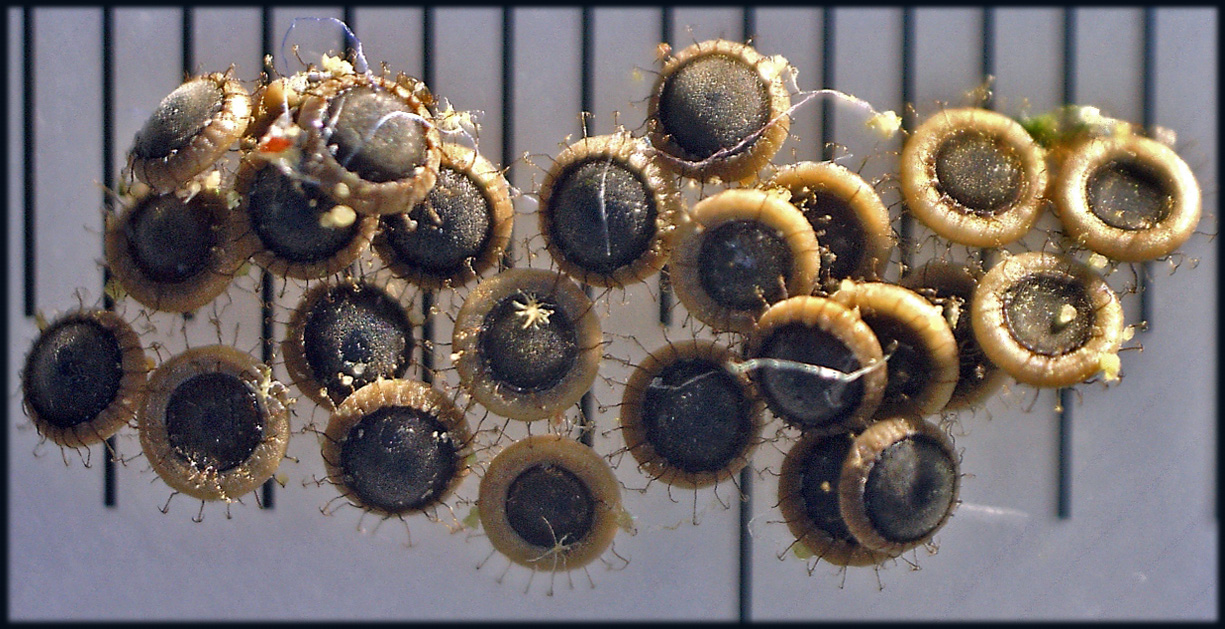
A collection of statoblasts of Cristatella mucedo

Phylactolaemate colonies reproduce sexually, and each member is a simultaneous hermaphrodite that functions as both male and female. They also reproduce asexually by a method that is unique among bryozoans and enables a colony's lineage to survive the variable and uncertain conditions of freshwater environments. Among the classes of the bryozoans, the phylactoaemata have the most aberrant spermatozoon. Throughout summer and autumn they produce disc-shaped statoblasts, masses of cells that function as "survival pods" rather like the gemmules of sponges. Statoblasts form on the funiculus (cord) connected to the parent's gut, which nourishes them. As they grow, statoblasts develop protective bivalve-like shells made of chitin. When they mature, some types stick to the parent colony, some fall to the bottom, some contain air spaces that enable them to float, and some remain in the parent's cystid (outer casing) to re-build the colony if it dies. Statoblasts can remain dormant for considerable periods, and while dormant can survive harsh conditions such as freezing and desiccation. They can be transported across long distances by animals, floating vegetation, currents and winds. When conditions improve, the valves of the shell separate and the cells inside develop into a zooid that tries to form a new colony. A study estimated that one group of colonies in a patch 1 square meter (11 sq ft) produced 800,000 statoblasts.
