= Chronogaster elegans =

Scientific classification
- Kingdom: Animalia
- Phylum: Nematoda
- Class: Chromadorea
- Order: Araeolaimida
- Family: Leptolaimidae
- Genus: Chronogaster
- Species: C. elegans

Binomial name
- Chronogaster elegans Raski & Maggenti, 1984

Species of roundworm

Chronogaster elegans is a species of nematodes. It is found in fresh water in the USA.

The Encyclopedia of Life (eol) places the genus in the order Araeolaimida and the family Leptolaimidae whereas Wikispecies and the World Register of Marine Species (WoRMS) place the genus in the order Plectida, superfamily Plectoidea and family Chronogastridae, where it is the type genus of the family.
