= Chronogaster =

Scientific classification
- Domain: Eukaryota
- Kingdom: Animalia
- Phylum: Nematoda
- Class: Chromadorea
- Order: Araeolaimida
- Family: Leptolaimidae
- Genus: Chronogaster; Cobb, 1913

Type species
- Chronogaster gracilis Cobb, 1913

Species
- Chronogaster alata Gerlach, 1956; Chronogaster boettgeri Kischke, 1956; Chronogaster brasiliensis Meyl, 1957; Chronogaster chilensis Raski and Maggenti, 1984; Chronogaster daoi Loof, 1964; Chronogaster elegans Raski & Maggenti, 1984; Chronogaster gracilis Cobb, 1913; Chronogaster longicollis (Daday, 1899); Chronogaster magnifica; Chronogaster subtilis; Chronogaster tenuis; Chronogaster troglodytes; Chronogaster typica (De Man, 1921)

Synonyms
- Walcherenia De Man, 1921

Genus of roundworms

Chronogaster is a genus of nematodes.

The Encyclopedia of Life (eol) places the genus in the order Araeolaimida and the family Leptolaimidae whereas Wikispecies and the World Register of Marine Species (WoRMS) place the genus in the order Plectida, superfamily Plectoidea and family Chronogastridae, where it is the type genus of the family.
