= Echinomermella =

Scientific classification
- Kingdom: Animalia
- Phylum: Nematoda
- Class: Chromadorea
- Order: Benthimermithida
- Family: Benthimermithidae
- Genus: Echinomermella; Chitwood, 1933

Genus of marine nematodes

Echinomermella is a genus of marine nematode containing two species, both which parasitize the body cavities of sea urchins. Their taxonomic classification has changed over time; a phylogeny constructed from 18S ribosomal RNA sequences originally placed them alongside the family Enoplidae, while more recent phylogenomic analysis of multigene datasets placed them within Plectidae. Their phylogenetic placement is important for determining the number of times parasitism has evolved within the group.

== Reproduction ==
E. matsi worms have two sexes. Adult males and immature females are similar, reaching 10-40mm in length for males, and 10-20mm for females. Mature females are larger, 30-50mm long, and carry as many as 700,000 developing eggs and larvae within their pseudocoelom. In urchin infections with few individuals, there are more female worms present than males, while in infections with many individuals, there are more males, which likely results from density-dependent regulation of the sex ratio.

== Ecology and environmental impact ==
High population density of sea urchins have been found to overgraze kelp beds. However, Echinomermella infection negatively impacts the fecundity of its hosts. While some urchins were found with high nematode infection rates and reduced gonads, at the population scale, the impact of nematode infection is not a major factor in the density and growth of urchins.
