= Trophomera marionensis =

Scientific classification
- Domain: Eukaryota
- Kingdom: Animalia
- Phylum: Nematoda
- Class: Chromadorea
- Order: Benthimermithida
- Family: Benthimermithidae
- Genus: Trophomera
- Species: T. marionensis

Binomial name
- Trophomera marionensis (Petter, 1983)

Species of roundworm

Trophomera marionensis is a deep-sea nematode endoparasite of the family Benthimermithidae. They can be found in one of the deepest parts of the ocean, for example, in the hadal zone 7,000 to 10,000 meters below sea level. They exist in relentless darkness under immense water pressure. Marine invertebrates are their definitive hosts. They infest a wide range of invertebrate marine hosts: polychaete, priapulids, crustaceans, and even other nematodes. Death of their host can result if they occupy the entire body, at which point they exit and reproduce.
