= Ironus =

Scientific classification
- Domain: Eukaryota
- Kingdom: Animalia
- Phylum: Nematoda
- Class: Enoplea
- Order: Enoplida
- Family: Ironidae
- Genus: Ironus; Bastian, 1865

Species
- Several, including: Ironus elegans; Ironus ignavus

Genus of roundworms

Ironus is a genus of nematodes.
