= Tripylella fatimaensis =

Scientific classification
- Domain: Eukaryota
- Kingdom: Animalia
- Phylum: Nematoda
- Class: Enoplea
- Order: Enoplida
- Family: Tripylidae
- Genus: Tripylella
- Species: T. fatimaensis

Binomial name
- Tripylella fatimaensis Cid del Prado Vera, Ferris & Nadler, 2016

Species of roundworm

Tripylella fatimaensis is a species of nematodes, first found in Quito, Ecuador. It can be distinguished by its rather short body (averaging 0.74 millimetres (0.029 in) in length); the length of its pharynx, tail and diameter portion; its lack of an excretory pore; possessing body pores as well as three pairs of caudal setae, among other characteristics.
