= Aegialoalaimus =

Scientific classification
- Domain: Eukaryota
- Kingdom: Animalia
- Phylum: Nematoda
- Class: Chromadorea
- Order: Plectida
- Family: Aegialoalaimidae
- Genus: Aegialoalaimus de Man, 1907

Genus of roundworms

Aegialoalaimus is a genus of nematodes belonging to the family Aegialoalaimidae.

The species of this genus are found in Europe and America.

Species:

- Aegialoalaimus bratteni Holovachov, 2015
- Aegialoalaimus conicaudatus Allgén, 1959
- Aegialoalaimus cylindricauda Allgén, 1933
- Aegialoalaimus elegans de Man, 1907
- Aegialoalaimus leptosoma Gagarin, 2012
- Aegialoalaimus paratenuicaudatus Allgén, 1959
- Aegialoalaimus punctatus (Allgén, 1929) 1931
- Aegialoalaimus sabulicola Allgén, 1933
- Aegialoalaimus setosa Bouwman, 1981
- Aegialoalaimus tenuicaudatus Allgén, 1932
- Aegialoalaimus tenuis Kreis, 1928
- Aegialoalaimus tereticauda Leduc & Zhao, 2021
