= Tripylella mexicana =

Scientific classification
- Domain: Eukaryota
- Kingdom: Animalia
- Phylum: Nematoda
- Class: Enoplea
- Order: Enoplida
- Family: Tripylidae
- Genus: Tripylella
- Species: T. mexicana

Binomial name
- Tripylella mexicana Cid del Prado Vera, Ferris & Nadler, 2016

Species of roundworm

Tripylella mexicana is a species of nematodes, first found in Mexico. It can be distinguished by its rather short body (averaging 0.74 millimetres (0.029 in) in length); having a short pharynx; its short tail; possession of an excretory pore as well as setae distributed throughout its body; having body pores; its striated cuticle carrying several anastomoses; non-protruding vulval lips, as well as other characteristics.
