= Tripylella muscusi =

Scientific classification
- Domain: Eukaryota
- Kingdom: Animalia
- Phylum: Nematoda
- Class: Enoplea
- Order: Enoplida
- Family: Tripylidae
- Genus: Tripylella
- Species: T. muscusi

Binomial name
- Tripylella muscusi Cid del Prado Vera, Ferris & Nadler, 2016

Species of roundworm

Tripylella muscusi is a species of nematodes, first found in Mexico. It can be distinguished by its body length (averaging 0.94 millimetres (0.037 in)); its pharynx and tail lengths; its possession of an excretory pore; exhibiting body pores and scant somatic setae; a striated cuticle carrying sparse anastomoses; as well as protruding vulval lips, among other characteristics.
