= Ironus elegans =

Scientific classification
- Domain: Eukaryota
- Kingdom: Animalia
- Phylum: Nematoda
- Class: Enoplea
- Order: Enoplida
- Family: Ironidae
- Genus: Ironus
- Species: I. elegans

Binomial name
- Ironus elegans Colomba & Vinciguerra, 1979

Species of roundworm

Ironus elegans is a species of freshwater nematodes. It is described from Sicily.
