= Trissonchulus janetae =

Scientific classification
- Kingdom: Animalia
- Phylum: Nematoda
- Class: Enoplea
- Order: Enoplida
- Family: Ironidae
- Genus: Trissonchulus
- Species: T. janetae

Binomial name
- Trissonchulus janetae Inglis, 1961

Species of roundworm

Trissonchulus janetae is a species of nematode from the family Ironidae. The scientific name of this species was first published in 1961 by Inglis.
