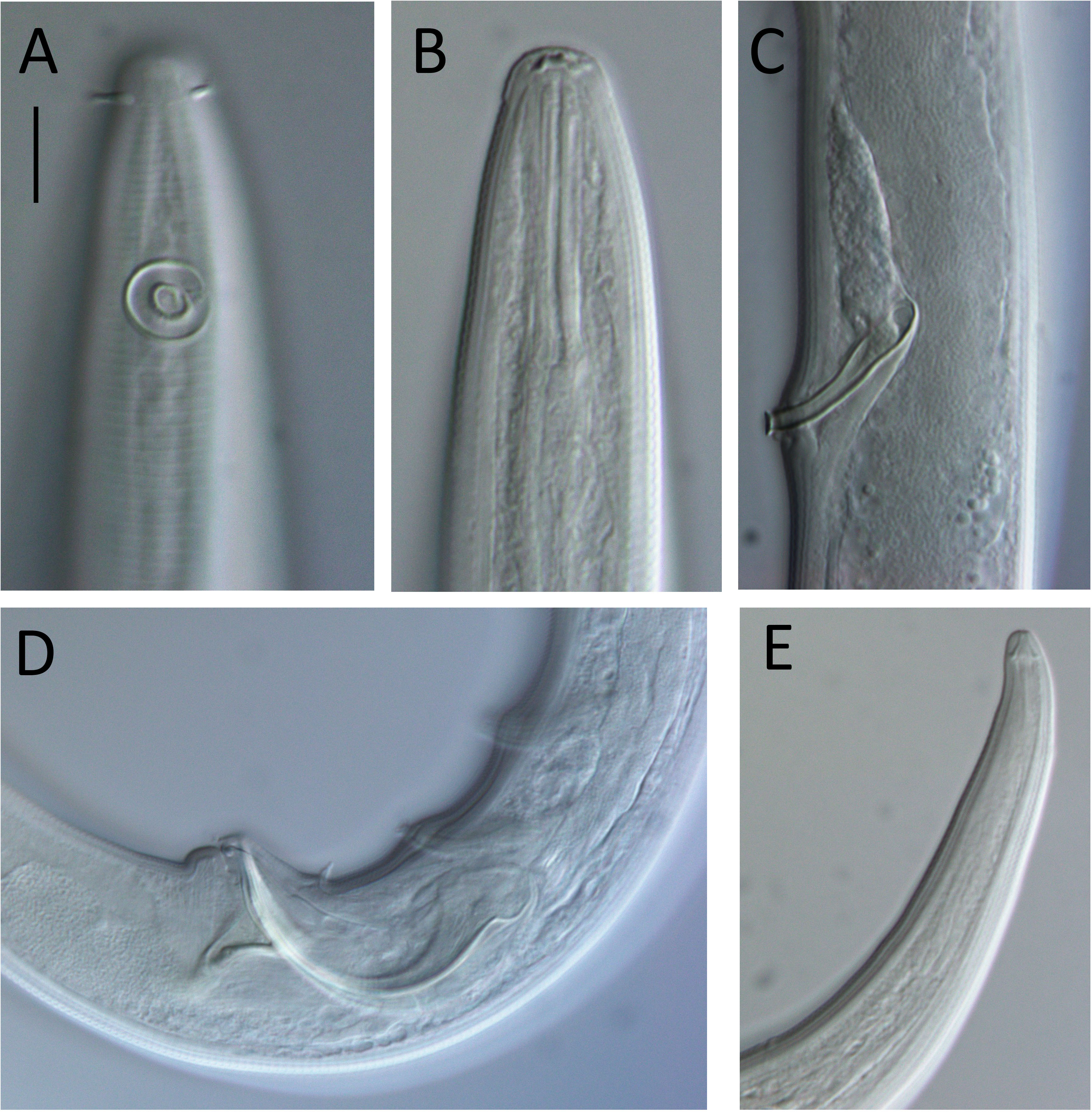
- Lavareda iramscotti

Scientific classification
- Domain: Eukaryota
- Kingdom: Animalia
- Phylum: Nematoda
- Class: Chromadorea
- Order: Leptolaimida
- Family: Rhadinematidae
- Genus: Lavareda da Fonseca-Genevois, Smol & Bezerra, 2011

= Lavareda =

Genus of roundworms

Lavareda is a genus of nematodes belonging to the family Rhadinematidae.

The species of this genus are found in New Zealand.

Species:

- Lavareda coronatus (Ditlevsen, 1930) Fonsêca-Genevois, Smol & Bezerra, 2011
- Lavareda decraemerae da Fonseca-Genevois, Smol & Bezerra, 2011
- Lavareda iramscotti Leduc, 2020
