= Trm10p =

Trm10p may refer to:

- TRNA (adenine9-N1)-methyltransferase, an enzyme
- TRNA (guanine9-N1)-methyltransferase, an enzyme
