= Tripylella quitoensis =

Scientific classification
- Domain: Eukaryota
- Kingdom: Animalia
- Phylum: Nematoda
- Class: Enoplea
- Order: Enoplida
- Family: Tripylidae
- Genus: Tripylella
- Species: T. quitoensis

Binomial name
- Tripylella quitoensis Cid del Prado Vera, Ferris & Nadler, 2016

Species of roundworm

Tripylella quitoensis is a species of nematodes, first found in Fátima, Portugal. It can be differentiated by its rather short body length (averaging 0.72 millimetres (0.028 in)); possessing short outer labial setae; its short pharynx; carrying anterior subventral teeth and a posterior dorsal tooth in the same stomal chamber; having a short tail; exhibiting body pores and somatic setae, as well as a striated cuticle and non-protruding vulval lips, among other characteristics.
