= Tripylella dentata =

Scientific classification
- Domain: Eukaryota
- Kingdom: Animalia
- Phylum: Nematoda
- Class: Enoplea
- Order: Enoplida
- Family: Tripylidae
- Genus: Tripylella
- Species: T. dentata

Binomial name
- Tripylella dentata Cid del Prado Vera, Ferris & Nadler, 2016

Species of roundworm

Tripylella dentata is a species of nematodes, first found in California. It can be differentiated from its cogenerate species by possessing two contiguous stomal chambers with two large teeth (dorsal and one ventral) in the posterior chamber, and two subventral teeth in the anterior one; having a short body (length averaging 0.85 millimetres (0.033 in)); the length of its pharynx and tail; carrying two cervical setae laterally, and showing pores along its body, among other characteristics.
