= Tripyla (nematode) =

Scientific classification
- Domain: Eukaryota
- Kingdom: Animalia
- Phylum: Nematoda
- Class: Enoplea
- Order: Enoplida
- Family: Tripylidae
- Genus: Tripyla; Bastian, 1865

Genus of roundworms

Tripyla is a genus of nematodes belonging to the family Tripylidae.

The genus was described in 1865 by Henry Charlton Bastian.

The genus has cosmopolitan distribution.

Species:

- Tripyla setifera Bütschli, 1873
- Tripyla sibirica Gagarin, 1993
- Tripyla subterranea Tsalolikhin, 1976
- Tripyla tenuis Brzeski, 1964
- Tripyla terricola Brzeski & Winiszewska-Slipinska, 1993
- Tripyla triloboides Rahm, 1932
- Tripyla vulvata Andrássy, 1977
