= TRNA(m1G9/m1A9)-methyltransferase =

TRNA(m1G9/m1A9)-methyltransferase may refer to the following enzymes:

- TRNA (adenine9-N1)-methyltransferase
- TRNA (guanine9-N1)-methyltransferase
