= Trophomera =

Scientific classification
- Domain: Eukaryota
- Kingdom: Animalia
- Phylum: Nematoda
- Class: Chromadorea
- Order: Benthimermithida
- Family: Benthimermithidae
- Genus: Trophomera; Rubtzov & Platonova, 1974

Genus of roundworms

Trophomera is a genus of nematodes belonging to the family Benthimermithidae.

The genus has cosmopolitan distribution.

Species:

- Trophomera abyssalis (Bussau, 1993) Miljutin, 2006
- Trophomera acuticauda (Petter, 1981) Miljutin, 2006
- Trophomera americana Miljutin, 2011
- Trophomera aptera (Petter, 1982) Miljutin, 2006
- Trophomera arnaudi (Petter, 1983) Miljutin, 2006
- Trophomera australis (Petter, 1983) Miljutin, 2006
- Trophomera bathycola (Rubtzov, 1980) Miljutin, 2004
- Trophomera breviptera (Petter, 1982) Miljutin, 2006
- Trophomera conchicola Holovachov et al., 2013
- Trophomera conicauda (Petter, 1987) Miljutin, 2006
- Trophomera crozetensis (Petter, 1983) Miljutin, 2006
- Trophomera diploptera (Petter, 1981) Miljutin, 2006
- Trophomera edouardensis (Petter, 1983) Miljutin, 2006
- Trophomera elegantis Miljutin & Miljutina, 2009
- Trophomera filiformis (Petter, 1987) Miljutin, 2006
- Trophomera fodinae Shimada, 2021
- Trophomera gracilis (Petter, 1982) Miljutin, 2006
- Trophomera granovitchi Tchesunov & Rozenberg, 2011
- Trophomera hopei (Petter, 1980) Miljutin, 2006
- Trophomera hureaui (Petter, 1983) Miljutin, 2006
- Trophomera ifremeri (Miljutin, 2004) Miljutin, 2006
- Trophomera improvisa (Miljutin, 2004) Miljutin, 2006
- Trophomera iturupiensis Rubtzov & Platonova, 1974
- Trophomera laubieri (Petter, 1987) Miljutin, 2006
- Trophomera leptosoma (Petter, 1981) Miljutin, 2006
- Trophomera litoralis Miljutin, 2006
- Trophomera longiovaris Miljutin, 2011
- Trophomera mangani Shimada, 2021
- Trophomera marionensis (Petter, 1983) Miljutin, 2006
- Trophomera megala (Petter, 1987) Miljutin, 2006
- Trophomera minuta (Petter, 1987) Miljutin, 2006
- Trophomera minutissima Miljutin & Miljutina, 2009
- Trophomera pacifica Miljutin & Miljutina, 2009
- Trophomera petterae (Miljutin, 2004) Miljutin, 2006
- Trophomera platyptera (Miljutin, 2004) Miljutin, 2006
- Trophomera pseudominuta (Miljutin, 2004) Miljutin, 2006
- Trophomera regalis (Bussau, 1993) Miljutin, 2006
- Trophomera rosaliae (Chesunov, 1988) Miljutin, 2006
- Trophomera rotundicauda (Petter, 1981) Miljutin, 2006
- Trophomera senckenbergi Miljutin & Miljutina, 2009
- Trophomera tchesunovi (Miljutin, 2004) Miljutin, 2006
- Trophomera turpicauda (Miljutin, 2004) Miljutin, 2006
