= Aegialoalaimidae =

Scientific classification
- Domain: Eukaryota
- Kingdom: Animalia
- Phylum: Nematoda
- Class: Chromadorea
- Order: Plectida
- Family: Aegialoalaimidae; Lorenzen, 1981

Family of roundworms

Aegialoalaimidae is a family of nematodes belonging to the order Plectida.

Genera:

- Aegialoalaimus de Man, 1907
