= Leptolaimida =

Scientific classification
- Domain: Eukaryota
- Kingdom: Animalia
- Phylum: Nematoda
- Class: Chromadorea
- Order: Leptolaimida

Order of roundworms

Leptolaimida is an order of nematodes belonging to the class Chromadorea.

Families:

- Aphanolaimidae Chitwood, 1936
- Ceramonematidae Cobb, 1933
- Diplopeltoididae Tchesunov, 1990
- Leptolaimidae Örley, 1880
- Ohridiidae Lorenzen, 1981
- Paramicrolaimidae Lorenzen, 1981
- Rhadinematidae Lorenzen, 1981
- Tarvaiidae Lorenzen, 1981
- Tubolaimoididae Lorenzen, 1981
