= Ohridiidae =

Scientific classification
- Domain: Eukaryota
- Kingdom: Animalia
- Phylum: Nematoda
- Class: Chromadorea
- Order: Leptolaimida
- Family: Ohridiidae; Lorenzen, 1981

Family of nematodes

Ohridiidae is a family of nematodes belonging to the order Leptolaimida.

Genera:

- Domorganus Goodey, 1946
