= Metateratocephalidae =

Scientific classification
- Domain: Eukaryota
- Kingdom: Animalia
- Phylum: Nematoda
- Class: Chromadorea
- Order: Plectida
- Family: Metateratocephalidae

Family of roundworms

Metateratocephalidae is a family of nematodes belonging to the order Plectida.

Genera:

- Metateratocephalus Eroshenko, 1973
- Steratocephalus Andrássy, 1984
