= Epacanthion =

Scientific classification
- Domain: Eukaryota
- Kingdom: Animalia
- Phylum: Nematoda
- Class: Enoplea
- Order: Enoplida
- Family: Thoracostomopsidae
- Genus: Epacanthion; Wieser, 1953

Genus of worms

Epacanthion is a genus of nematodes belonging to the family Thoracostomopsidae.

The genus has almost cosmopolitan distribution.

Species:

- Epacanthion agubernaculus Guilherme, da Silva & Morgado Esteves, 2009
- Epacanthion ampullatum Lo Russo, Villares, Martelli, Pastor De Ward & Harguinteguy, 2012
- Epacanthion bicuspidatum Lo Russo, Villares, Martelli, Pastor De Ward & Harguinteguy, 2012
- Epacanthion brevispiculosum Mawson, 1958
- Epacanthion brevispiculum Mawson, 1956
- Epacanthion buetschlii (Southern, 1914) Wieser, 1953
- Epacanthion buetschlii Southern, 1914
- Epacanthion crassum (Ditlevsen, 1926) Wieser, 1953
- Epacanthion durapelle (Kreis, 1929) Wieser, 1953
- Epacanthion enoploidiforme (Gerlach, 1953) Warwick, 1970
- Epacanthion fasciculatum Shi & Xu, 2016
- Epacanthion filicaudatum Mawson, 1956
- Epacanthion flagellicauda Gerlach, 1956
- Epacanthion galeatum Boucher, 1977
- Epacanthion georgei Inglis, 1971
- Epacanthion gorgonocephalum Warwick, 1970
- Epacanthion hirsutum Shi & Xu, 2016
- Epacanthion incurvatum (Ditlevsen, 1926) Wieser, 1953
- Epacanthion longicaudatum Shi & Xu, 2016
- Epacanthion macrolaimus Gagarin, 2009
- Epacanthion mawsoni Warwick, 1977
- Epacanthion microdentatum Wieser, 1953
- Epacanthion multipapillatum (Wieser, 1959) Inglis, 1966
- Epacanthion murmanicum (Ssaweljev, 1912) Inglis, 1966
- Epacanthion nadjae Sergeeva, 1974
- Epacanthion oliffi Inglis, 1966
- Epacanthion oweni Keppner, 1986
- Epacanthion pellucidum (Ssaweljev, 1912) Inglis, 1966
- Epacanthion polysetosum (Jensen, 1986) Greenslade & Nicholas, 1991
- Epacanthion quadridiscus Shimada, Kajihara & Mawatari, 2009
- Epacanthion saveljevi (Filipjev, 1927) Greenslade & Nicholas, 1991
- Epacanthion sparsisetae Shi & Xu, 2016
- Epacanthion stekhoveni Greenslade & Nicholas, 1991
