= Tarvaiidae =

Scientific classification
- Domain: Eukaryota
- Kingdom: Animalia
- Phylum: Nematoda
- Class: Chromadorea
- Order: Leptolaimida
- Family: Tarvaiidae; Lorenzen, 1981

Family of nematodes

Tarvaiidae is a family of nematodes belonging to the order Leptolaimida.

Genera:

- Tarvaia Allgén, 1934
