= Ludwig Bruns =

German neurologist (1858–1916)

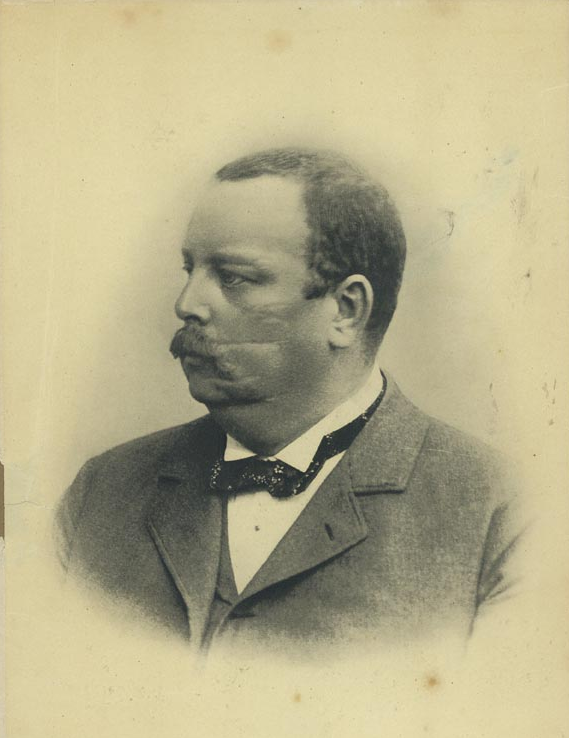
Ludwig Bruns

Ludwig Bruns (25 June 1858 – 9 November 1916) was a German neurologist who was a native of Hanover.

He studied medicine in Göttingen (since 1878: member of Corps Hannovera Göttingen) and Munich, receiving his doctorate in 1882. Subsequently, he was an assistant to Eduard Hitzig (1839-1907) at the insane asylum in Nietleben as well as at the psychiatric and nerve clinic in Halle. Afterwards he worked with Karl Westphal (1833-1890) and Hermann Oppenheim (1858-1919) at the Charité Hospital in Berlin. Bruns would maintain a working relationship with Oppenheim throughout his professional career. He also studied in Paris (under Jean Charcot) and England, later returning to his hometown of Hanover, where in 1903 he became a professor of neurology. Bruns was the first director of the Gesellschaft Deutscher Nervenärzte (German Society of Neurologists).

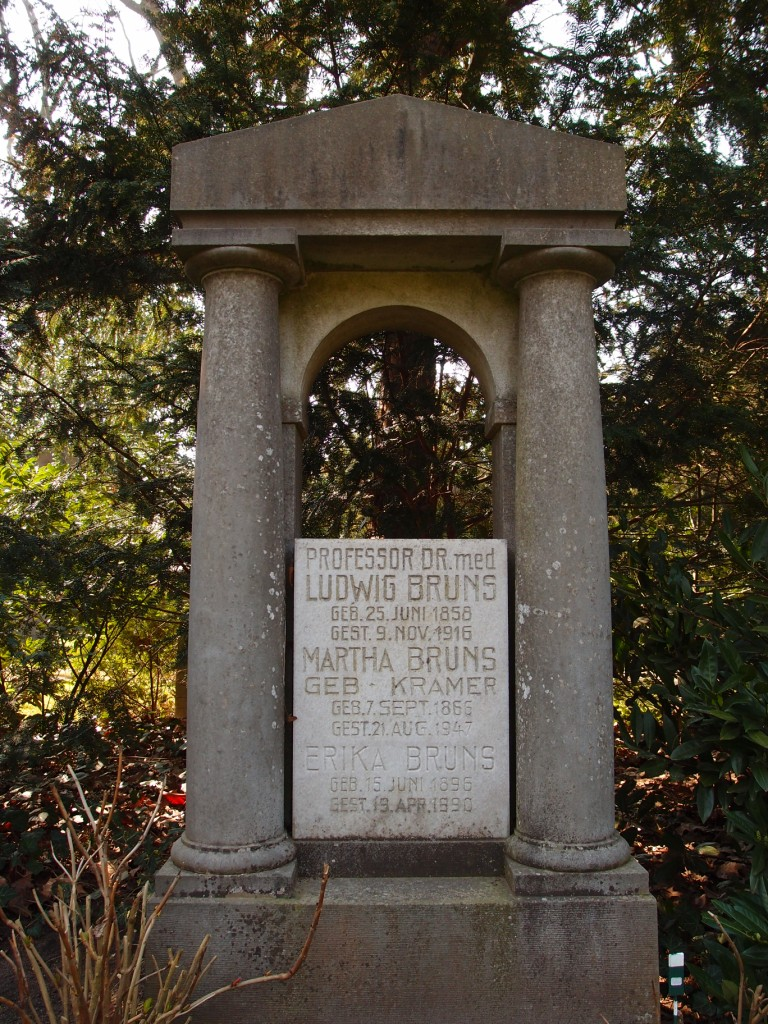
Gravesite of Ludwig Bruns at the Engesohder Friedhof in Hannover

Bruns was interested in all aspects of neurology, however he is best known for his work in the fields of child neurology and neuropsychology. In 1906 he published Die Hysterie im Kindesalter (Hysteria in Childhood), in which he explains that abnormal behaviour in children is due to internal conflicts, being largely caused by overbearing parents who favor harsh punishment. His most significant work was Handbuch der Nervenkrankheiten im Kindesalter (Handbook of Nervous Diseases of Childhood), a textbook he co-authored with August Cramer (1860-1912) and Theodor Ziehen (1862-1950). In addition. he published an important treatise on localization of tumors titled Die Geschwultse des Nervensystem (Tumors of the Nervous System).

== Associated eponyms ==
- Bruns ataxia: Difficulty in moving the feet when they are in contact with the ground and a tendency to fall backwards, associated with frontal lobe lesions.
- Bruns’ syndrome: Characterized by sudden and severe headache, accompanied by vomiting and vertigo, triggered by abrupt movement of the head. Principal causes are cysts and cysticerosis of the fourth ventricle, and tumours of the midline of the cerebellum and third ventricle.
- Bastian-Bruns law: In complete transverse lesion in the upper spinal cord, the tendon reflexes and muscular tone below the level of the lesion are lost. Named with neurologist Henry Charlton Bastian (1837-1915).
- Bruns nystagmus: Bilateral nystagmus found in patients with vestibular schwannoma.
