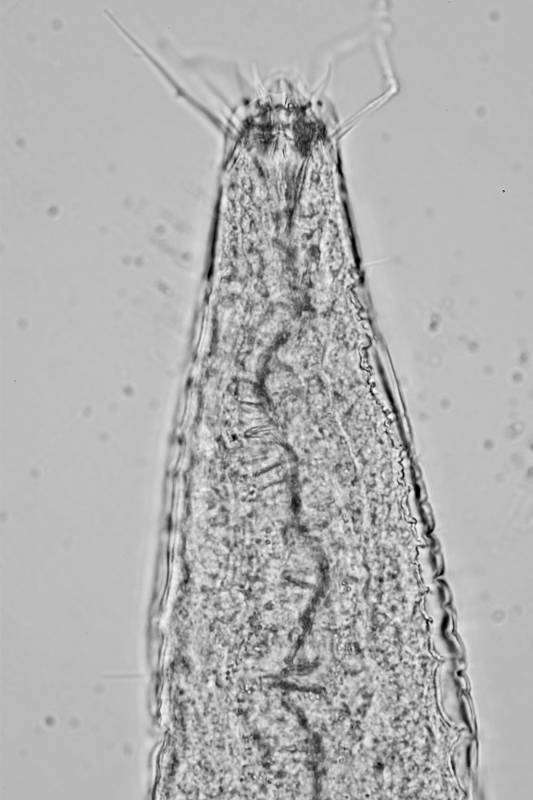

Scientific classification
- Domain: Eukaryota
- Kingdom: Animalia
- Phylum: Nematoda
- Class: Enoplea
- Order: Enoplida
- Family: Thoracostomopsidae
- Genus: Mesacanthion; Filipjev, 1927

= Mesacanthion =

Genus of roundworms

Mesacanthion is a genus of nematodes belonging to the family Thoracostomopsidae.

The genus has almost cosmopolitan distribution.

Species:

- Mesacanthion africanthiforme Warwick, 1970
- Mesacanthion africanum Gerlach, 1957
- Mesacanthion agubernatus Vitiello, 1971
- Mesacanthion alexandrinus Nicholas, 1993
- Mesacanthion arabium Warwick, 1973
- Mesacanthion arcuatile Wieser, 1959
- Mesacanthion armatum Timm, 1961
- Mesacanthion audax (Ditlevsen, 1918) Filipjev, 1927
- Mesacanthion banale (Filipjev, 1927) Gerlach & Riemann, 1974
- Mesacanthion brachycolle Allgén, 1959
- Mesacanthion breviseta (Filipjev, 1927) Gerlach & Riemann, 1974
- Mesacanthion cavei Inglis, 1964
- Mesacanthion ceeum Inglis, 1964
- Mesacanthion conicum (Filipjev, 1918) Filipjev, 1927
- Mesacanthion cricetoides Wieser, 1959
- Mesacanthion diplechma (Southern, 1914) Filipjev, 1927
- Mesacanthion ditlevseni (Filipjev, 1927) Gerlach & Riemann, 1974
- Mesacanthion donsitarvae (Allgen, 1935) Wieser, 1953
- Mesacanthion fricum Inglis, 1966
- Mesacanthion gracilisetosum (Allgén, 1930) Wieser, 1953
- Mesacanthion hawaiiense (Allgen, 1951) Wieser, 1953
- Mesacanthion heterospiculum Sergeeva, 1974
- Mesacanthion hirsutum Gerlach, 1953
- Mesacanthion infantile (Ditlevsen, 1930) De Coninck & Schuurmans Stekhoven, 1933
- Mesacanthion jejuensis Jeong, Tchesunov & Lee, 2019
- Mesacanthion karense (Filipjev, 1927) Gerlach & Riemann, 1974
- Mesacanthion kerguelense Mawson, 1958
- Mesacanthion longispiculum Gerlach, 1954
- Mesacanthion longissimesetosum Wieser, 1953
- Mesacanthion lucifer (Filipjev, 1927) Gerlach & Riemann, 1974
- Mesacanthion majus (Filipjev, 1927) Gerlach & Riemann, 1974
- Mesacanthion marisalbi Platonova, 1976
- Mesacanthion monhystera Gerlach, 1967
- Mesacanthion obscurum Gagarin & Klerman, 2006
- Mesacanthion pacificum (Allgen, 1947) Wieser, 1953
- Mesacanthion pali Wieser, 1959
- Mesacanthion pannosum Wieser, 1959
- Mesacanthion paradentatum (Allgén, 1932) Wieser, 1953
- Mesacanthion primitivum (Allgen, 1929) Wieser, 1953
- Mesacanthion propinquum Gagarin & Klerman, 2006
- Mesacanthion proximum Gerlach, 1957
- Mesacanthion rigens Gerlach, 1957
- Mesacanthion southerni Warwick, 1973
- Mesacanthion studiosum Inglis, 1964
- Mesacanthion tenuicaudatum (Ssaweljev, 1912) De Coninck & Schuurmans Stekhoven, 1933
- Mesacanthion ungulatum Wieser, 1953
- Mesacanthion virile (Ditlevsen, 1930) De Coninck & Schuurmans Stekhoven, 1933
