= Leptosomatidae =

Scientific classification
- Kingdom: Animalia
- Phylum: Nematoda
- Class: Enoplea
- Order: Enoplida
- Suborder: Ironina
- Superfamily: Ironoidea
- Family: Leptosomatidae; Filipjev, 1916

Subfamilies and genera
- Barbonematinae; Barbonema Filipjev, 1927; Cylicolaiminae; Cylicolaimus de Man, 1889; Metacylicolaimus Schuurmans Stekhoven, 1946; Paracylicolaimus Platonova, 1970; Deontostomatinae Belogurov & Fadeeva, 1985; Deontostoma Filipjev, 1916; Tapia Belogurov & Fadeeva, 1985; Leptosomatinae Filipjev, 1916; Bongersia Platonova, 1988; Leptosomatides Filipjev, 1918; Leptosomatum Bastian, 1865; Leptosomella Filipjev, 1927; Orthophallonema Bongers, 1983; Paraleptosomatides Mawson, 1956; Syringonomus Hope & Murphy, 1969; Tubolaimella Cobb, 1933; Platycominae; Platycoma Cobb, 1894; Platycomopsis Ditlevsen, 1926; Proplatycoma Platonova, 1976; Pseudoplatycoma Chen, 2015; Synonchinae Platonova, 1970; Anivanema Platonova, 1976; Eusynonchus Platonova, 1970; Macronchus Inglis, 1964; Paratuerkiana Platonova, 1970; Sadkonavis Platonova, 1979; Synonchoides Wieser, 1956; Synonchus Cobb, 1894; Triaulolaimus Platonova, 1979; Tuerkiana Platonova, 1970; Thoracostomatinae De Coninck, 1965; Pseudocella Filipjev, 1927; Thoracostoma Marion, 1870; Triceratonematinae Belogurov & Fadeeva, 1985; Pseudotriceratonema Belogurov & Fadeeva, 1985; Triceratonema Platonova, 1976

Family of roundworms

Leptosomatidae is a family of benthic marine nematode worms.
