= Rhadinematidae =

Scientific classification
- Kingdom: Animalia
- Phylum: Nematoda
- Class: Chromadorea
- Order: Leptolaimida
- Family: Rhadinematidae; Lorenzen, 1981

Family of nematodes

Rhadinematidae is a family of nematodes belonging to the order Leptolaimida.

Genera:

- Cricolaimus Southern, 1914
- Lavareda da Fonseca-Genevois, Smol & Bezerra, 2011
- Rhadinema Cobb, 1920
