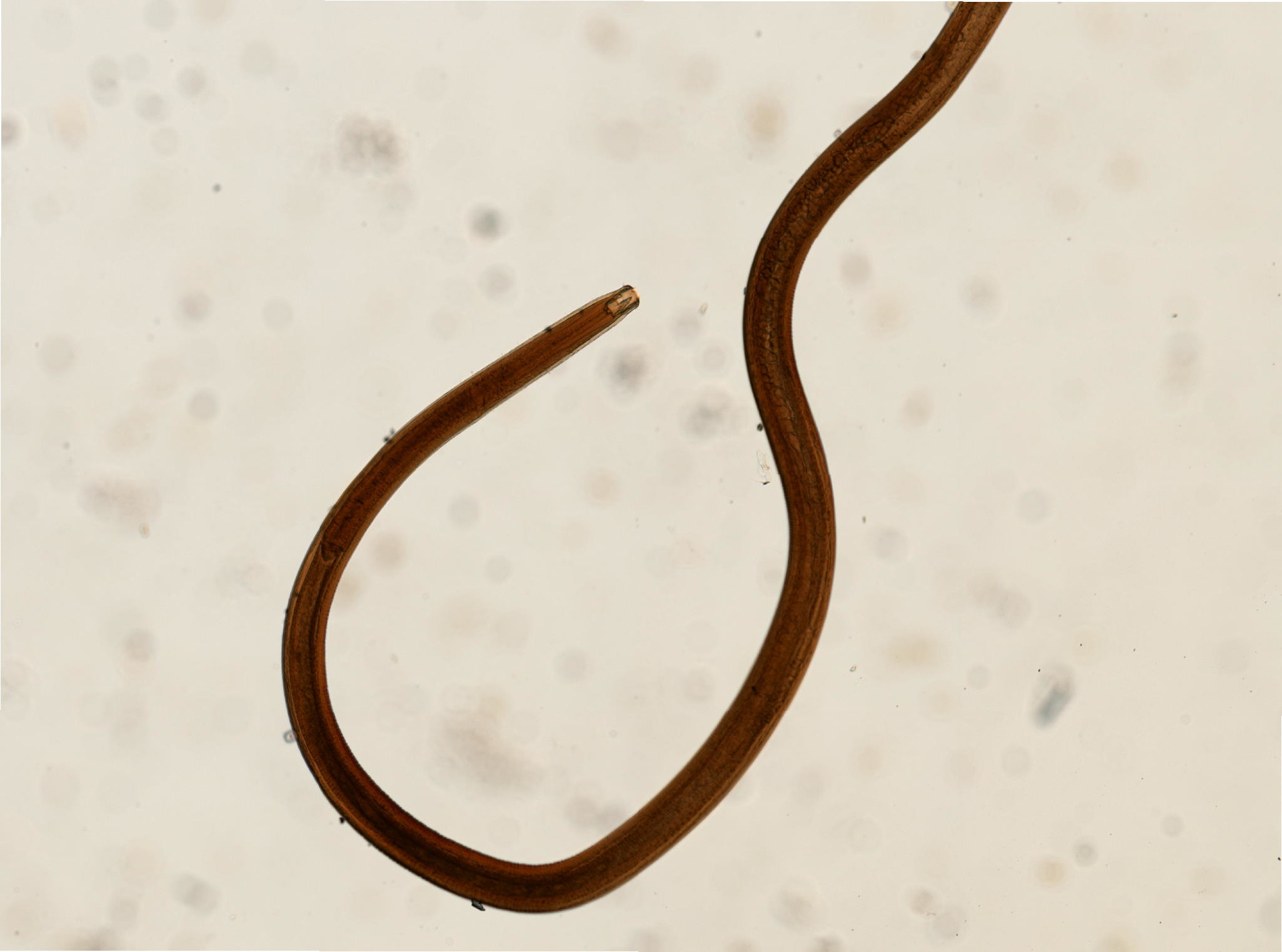
- Metoncholaimus

Scientific classification
- Kingdom: Animalia
- Phylum: Nematoda
- Class: Enoplea
- Order: Enoplida
- Family: Oncholaimidae
- Genus: Metoncholaimus; Filipjev, 1918

= Metoncholaimus =

Genus of worms

Metoncholaimus is a genus of nematodes belonging to the family Oncholaimidae.

The genus has almost cosmopolitan distribution.

Species:

- Metoncholaimus albidus (Bastian, 1865) Filipjev, 1918
- Metoncholaimus amplus Hopper, 1967
- Metoncholaimus antarcticus (von Linstow, 1896) Filipjev, 1918
- Metoncholaimus anthophorus (Ssaweljev, 1912) Filipjev, 1918
- Metoncholaimus demani (Zur Strassen, 1894) Filipjev, 1918
- Metoncholaimus denticaudatus Schuurmans Stekhoven & Adam, 1931
- Metoncholaimus filispiculum Yoshimura, 1982
- Metoncholaimus haplotretos Mawson, 1958
- Metoncholaimus intermedius Wieser & Hopper, 1967
- Metoncholaimus isopapillatus Tahseen, Siddiqi & Mustaqim, 2016
- Metoncholaimus longiovum Chitwood, 1960
- Metoncholaimus medispiculatum Salma, Nasira, Saima & Shahina, 2017
- Metoncholaimus moles Zhang & Platt, 1983
- Metoncholaimus murphyi Inglis, 1966
- Metoncholaimus paracavatus Lo Russo & Pastor De Ward, 2019
- Metoncholaimus parasimplex Keppner, 1987
- Metoncholaimus pelor Hopper, 1967
- Metoncholaimus perdisus Lo Russo & Pastor De Ward, 2019
- Metoncholaimus pristiurus (Zur Strassen, 1894) Filipjev, 1918
- Metoncholaimus sanmatiensis Lo Russo & Pastor De Ward, 2019
- Metoncholaimus scissus Wieser & Hopper, 1966
- Metoncholaimus siddiqii Shahina, Nasira & Shamim, 2015
- Metoncholaimus simplex Wieser & Hopper, 1967
- Metoncholaimus trichospiculum (Allgen, 1947) Wieser, 1953
- Metoncholaimus unguentarius Wieser, 1959
- Metoncholaimus uvifer Wieser, 1959
