= Diplopeltoididae =

Scientific classification
- Domain: Eukaryota
- Kingdom: Animalia
- Phylum: Nematoda
- Class: Chromadorea
- Order: Leptolaimida
- Family: Diplopeltoididae; Tchesunov, 1990

Family of roundworms

Diplopeltoididae is a family of nematodes belonging to the order Leptolaimida.

Genera:

- Diplopeltoides Gerlach, 1962
