= Enoploides =

Scientific classification
- Domain: Eukaryota
- Kingdom: Animalia
- Phylum: Nematoda
- Class: Enoplea
- Order: Enoplida
- Family: Thoracostomopsidae
- Genus: Enoploides; Ssaweljev, 1912

Genus of roundworms

Enoploides is a genus of nematodes belonging to the family Thoracostomopsidae.

The genus has almost cosmopolitan distribution.

Species:

- Enoploides amphioxi Filipjev, 1918
- Enoploides bisulcus Wieser & Hopper, 1967
- Enoploides brattstroemi Wieser, 1953
- Enoploides brevis Filipjev, 1918
- Enoploides brunettii Gerlach, 1953
- Enoploides caspersi Riemann, 1966
- Enoploides cephalophorus (Ditlevsen, 1918) Filipjev, 1927
- Enoploides cirrhatus Filipjev, 1918
- Enoploides delamarei Boucher, 1977
- Enoploides disparilis Sergeeva, 1974
- Enoploides fluviatilis Micoletzky, 1923
- Enoploides fluviatilus Micoletzky, 1923
- Enoploides gryphus Wieser & Hopper, 1967
- Enoploides harpax Wieser, 1959
- Enoploides hirsutus Filipjev, 1918
- Enoploides incurvatus (Ditlevsen, 1926) Greenslade & Nicholas, 1991
- Enoploides italicus (Steiner, 1921) Filipjev, 1918
- Enoploides kerguelensis Mawson, 1958
- Enoploides koreanus Jeong, Tchesunov & Lee, 2020
- Enoploides labiatus (Bütschli, 1874) Filipjev, 1918
- Enoploides labrostriatus (Southern, 1914) Filipjev, 1921
- Enoploides longicaudatus Wieser, 1953
- Enoploides longisetosus Schuurmans Stekhoven, 1943
- Enoploides longispiculosus Vitiello, 1967
- Enoploides macrochaetus (Allgen, 1929) De Coninck & Schuurmans Stekhoven, 1933
- Enoploides mandibularis Coles, 1977
- Enoploides oligochaetus Mawson, 1956
- Enoploides paralabiatus Wieser, 1953
- Enoploides polysetosus Jensen, 1986
- Enoploides ponticus Sergeeva, 1974
- Enoploides pterognathus Mawson, 1956
- Enoploides reductus Wieser, 1953
- Enoploides rimiformis Pavljuk, 1984
- Enoploides sabulicola (Allgen, 1933) Wieser, 1953
- Enoploides spiculohamatus Schulz, 1932
- Enoploides stewarti Nicholas, 1993
- Enoploides suecicus De Coninck & Stekhoven, 1933
- Enoploides tridentatus Ssaweljev, 1912
- Enoploides typicus Ssaweljev, 1912
- Enoploides tyrannis Bussau, 1993
- Enoploides tyrrhenicus Brunetti, 1949
- Enoploides uniformis Pavljuk, 1984
- Enoploides vectis Gerlach, 1957
