= Aphanolaimidae =

Scientific classification
- Domain: Eukaryota
- Kingdom: Animalia
- Phylum: Nematoda
- Class: Chromadorea
- Order: Leptolaimida
- Family: Aphanolaimidae; Chitwood, 1936

Family of roundworms

Aphanolaimidae is a family of nematodes belonging to the order Leptolaimida.

Genera:

- Anonchus Cobb, 1913
- Aphanolaimus de Man, 1880
- Aphanonchus Coomans & Raski, 1991
- Paraphanolaimus Micoletzky, 1922
