= Thalassogeneridae =

Scientific classification
- Domain: Eukaryota
- Kingdom: Animalia
- Phylum: Nematoda
- Class: Enoplea
- Order: Enoplida
- Superfamily: Oncholaimoidea
- Family: Thalassogeneridae; Orton Williams & Jairajpuri, 1984

Family of nematodes

Thalassogeneridae is a family of nematodes belonging to the order Enoplida.
