= Leptolaimus =

Scientific classification
- Domain: Eukaryota
- Kingdom: Animalia
- Phylum: Nematoda
- Class: Chromadorea
- Order: Araeolaimida
- Family: Leptolaimidae
- Genus: Leptolaimus de Man, 1876

Genus of nematodes

Leptolaimus is a genus of nematodes belonging to the family Leptolaimidae.

The genus has almost cosmopolitan distribution.

Species:

- Leptolaimus acicula Lorenzen, 1966
- Leptolaimus affinis Fadeeva & Mordukhovich, 2007
- Leptolaimus alatus Vitiello, 1971
- Leptolaimus alekseevi Fadeeva & Mordukhovich, 2007
- Leptolaimus ampullaceus Warwick, 1970
- Leptolaimus antarcticus (Cobb, 1914)
- Leptolaimus cangionensis (Gagarin & Thanh, 2007) Holovachov & Boström, 2013
- Leptolaimus cupulatus Lorenzen, 1972
- Leptolaimus danicus Jensen, 1978
- Leptolaimus dififtinus Leduc, 2020
- Leptolaimus dimorphus Gharahkhani, Pourjam, Holovachov & Pedram, 2020
- Leptolaimus ditlevseni (Steiner, 1916) De Coninck, 1965
- Leptolaimus donsi (Allgén, 1947) Holovachov & Boström, 2013
- Leptolaimus elegans (Stekhoven & De Coninck, 1933) Gerlach, 1958
- Leptolaimus exilis (Cobb, 1920) Holovachov & Boström, 2013
- Leptolaimus fluvialis Alekseev, 1981
- Leptolaimus formosus Bussau, 1993
- Leptolaimus gabinoi Villares & Pastor de Ward, 2012
- Leptolaimus gerlachi Murphy, 1966
- Leptolaimus harpaga (Boucher & de Bovée, 1972) Holovachov & Boström, 2013
- Leptolaimus holovachovi Qiao, Jia & Huang, 2020
- Leptolaimus hormozganensis Gharahkhani, Pourjam, Holovachov & Pedram, 2020
- Leptolaimus hydrothermalis Tchesunov, 2015
- Leptolaimus kerguelensis de Bovee, 1977
- Leptolaimus leptaleus Lorenzen, 1972
- Leptolaimus limicolus Lorenzen, 1972
- Leptolaimus longiseta (Allgén, 1934) De Coninck, 1965
- Leptolaimus longispiculus Alekseev & Rassadnikova, 1977
- Leptolaimus lorenzeni (Boucher & de Bovée, 1972) Holovachov & Boström, 2013
- Leptolaimus luridus Timm, 1963
- Leptolaimus macer Lorenzen, 1972
- Leptolaimus maximus Chitwood, 1936
- Leptolaimus membranatus (Wieser, 1951) De Coninck, 1965
- Leptolaimus meyer-reili Jensen, 1991
- Leptolaimus minutus (Schuurmans Stekhoven, 1942) Holovachov & Boström, 2013
- Leptolaimus mixtus Lorenzen, 1972
- Leptolaimus nobilis Gerlach, 1956
- Leptolaimus nonus Holovachov & Boström, 2013
- Leptolaimus octavus Holovachov & Boström, 2013
- Leptolaimus papilliger de Man, 1876
- Leptolaimus paravenustus Fadeeva & Mordukhovich, 2007
- Leptolaimus pellucidus (Southern, 1914) Holovachov & Boström, 2013
- Leptolaimus plectoides Chitwood, 1951
- Leptolaimus pocillus de Bovée, 1974
- Leptolaimus praeclarus Timm, 1961
- Leptolaimus primus Holovachov & Boström, 2013
- Leptolaimus puccinelliae Gerlach, 1959
- Leptolaimus pumicosus Vitiello, 1971
- Leptolaimus pumilus Gagarin & Thanh, 2009
- Leptolaimus quartus Holovachov & Boström, 2013
- Leptolaimus quintus Holovachov & Boström, 2013
- Leptolaimus rivalis (Gagarin & Thanh, 2007) Holovachov & Boström, 2013
- Leptolaimus sachalinensis Fadeeva & Mordukhovich, 2007
- Leptolaimus scotlandicus Jayasree & Warwick, 1977
- Leptolaimus sebastiani Pastor de Ward, 1984
- Leptolaimus secundus Holovachov & Boström, 2013
- Leptolaimus septempapillatus Platt, 1973
- Leptolaimus septimus Holovachov & Boström, 2013
- Leptolaimus sergeevae (Ürkmez & Brennan, 2013) Holovachov & Boström, 2013
- Leptolaimus setiger Schuurmans Stekhoven & De Coninck, 1933
- Leptolaimus sextus Holovachov & Boström, 2013
- Leptolaimus steineri (Filipjev, 1922) De Coninck, 1965
- Leptolaimus surdus Gerlach, 1957
- Leptolaimus tenuis Gerlach, 1956
- Leptolaimus tertius Holovachov & Boström, 2013
- Leptolaimus trichodes (Kreis, 1929) De Coninck, 1965
- Leptolaimus tritubulatus Boucher & Helléouët, 1977
- Leptolaimus venustus Lorenzen, 1972
- Leptolaimus vinnulus Vitiello, 1974
- Leptolaimus vipriensis Gagarin & Thanh, 2005
- Leptolaimus vitielloi Holovachov & Boström, 2013
