= Tripylella =

Scientific classification
- Domain: Eukaryota
- Kingdom: Animalia
- Phylum: Nematoda
- Class: Enoplea
- Order: Enoplida
- Family: Tripylidae
- Genus: Tripylella; Brzeski & Winiszewska-Slipinska, 1993

Genus of worms

Tripylella is a genus of nematodes belonging to the family Tripylidae.

The genus has almost cosmopolitan distribution.

Species:

- Tripylella australis Xu, Zhao, Davies & Wang, 2017
- Tripylella dentata Cid del Prado-Vera, Ferris & Nadler, 2016
- Tripylella fatimaensis Cid del Prado-Vera, Ferris & Nadler, 2016
- Tripylella incunda Andrássy, 2006
- Tripylella intermedia (Bütschli, 1873) Brzeski & Winiszewska-Slipinska, 1993
- Tripylella intermedia Bütschli, 1873
- Tripylella iucunda Andrassy, 2008
- Tripylella jianjuni Xu, Leduc, Ye & Zhao, 2018
- Tripylella mexicana Cid del Prado-Vera, Ferris & Nadler, 2016
- Tripylella muscusi Cid del Prado-Vera, Ferris & Nadler, 2016
- Tripylella quitoensis Cid del Prado-Vera, Ferris & Nadler, 2016
- Tripylella subintermedia Zhao, Xi & Xu, 2014
