= Greenia =

Greenia may refer to:

- Greenia (phasmid), a genus of phasmids in the family Phasmatidae
- Greenia, a genus of arthropods in the family Laelapidae, synonym of Dinogamasus
- Greenia, a genus of nematodes in the family Rhabdolaimidae, synonym of Rogerus
- Greenia, a genus of plants in the family Poaceae, synonym of Limnodea
