= Phanodermatidae =

Scientific classification
- Kingdom: Animalia
- Phylum: Nematoda
- Class: Enoplea
- Order: Enoplida
- Family: Phanodermatidae

Family of nematodes

Phanodermatidae is a family of nematodes belonging to the order Enoplida.

== Genera ==
Genera:

- Crenopharynx Bastian, 1865
- Crenopharynx Filipjev, 1934
- Dayellus Inglis, 1964
