= Enchelidiidae =

Scientific classification
- Domain: Eukaryota
- Kingdom: Animalia
- Phylum: Nematoda
- Class: Enoplea
- Order: Enoplida
- Superfamily: Oncholaimoidea
- Family: Enchelidiidae

Synonyms
- Enchelliidae; Eurystomidae

Family of roundworms

Enchelidiidae is a family of nematodes belonging to the order Enoplida.

== Genera ==
The following genera are recognised in the family Enchelidiidae:

- Abelbolla Huang & Zhang, 2004
- Aronema Fadeeva & Belogurov, 1988
- Bathyeurystomina Lambshead & Platt, 1979
- Belbolla (Cobb, 1920) Andrássy, 1973
- Bernardius da Fonsêca-Genevois, Smol, Decraemer & Venekey, 2009
- Calyptronema Marion, 1870
- Ditlevsenella Filipjev, 1927
- Eurystomina Filipjev, 1921
- Illium Cobb, 1920
- Ledovitia Filipjev, 1927
- Lyranema Timm, 1961
- Megeurystomina Luc & De Coninck, 1959
- Pareurystomina Micoletzky, 1930
- Polygastrophoides Sun & Huang, 2016
- Polygastrophora de Man, 1922
- Symplocostoma Bastian, 1865
- Symplocostomella Micoletzky, 1930
- Thoonchus Cobb, 1920
