= Oncholaimoidea =

Scientific classification
- Domain: Eukaryota
- Kingdom: Animalia
- Phylum: Nematoda
- Class: Enoplea
- Order: Enoplida
- Suborder: Oncholaimina; De Ley & Blaxter, 2002
- Superfamily: Oncholaimoidea; Filipjev, 1916

Families
- Enchelidiidae Filipjev, 1918; Oncholaimidae Filipjev, 1916; Thalassogeneridae Orton Williams & Jairajpuri, 1984

Suborder of roundworms

Oncholaimoidea is a superfamily of nematodes. It is the only superfamily in the monotypic suborder Oncholaimina .
