= Benthimermithidae =

Scientific classification
- Kingdom: Animalia
- Phylum: Nematoda
- Class: Chromadorea
- Order: Benthimermithida
- Family: Benthimermithidae

Family of roundworms

Benthimermithidae is a family of nematodes belonging to the order Benthimermithida.

Genera:

- Adenodelphis Petter, 1983
- Bathynema Miljutin & Miljutina, 2009
- Trophomera Rubtzov & Platonova, 1974
- Echinomermella Jones & Hagen, 1987
