= Trefusiidae =

Scientific classification
- Domain: Eukaryota
- Kingdom: Animalia
- Phylum: Nematoda
- Class: Enoplea
- Order: Enoplida
- Family: Trefusiidae

Family of worms

Trefusiidae is a family of nematodes belonging to the order Enoplida.

== Genera ==
Genera:

- Africanema Vincx & Furstenberg, 1988
- Alaimonemella Allgén, 1935
- Cytolaimium Cobb, 1920
