= Bruns apraxia =

- Specialty: Neurology

Bruns apraxia, or frontal ataxia, is a gait apraxia found in patients with bilateral frontal lobe disorders. It is characterised by an inability to initiate the process of walking, despite the power and coordination of the legs being normal when tested in the seated or lying position. The gait is broad-based with short steps with a tendency to fall backwards. It was originally described in patients with frontal lobe tumours, but is now more commonly seen in patients with cerebrovascular disease.

It is named after Ludwig Bruns.

== Symptoms and signs ==
Unlike ataxias of cerebellar origin, Bruns apraxia exhibits many frontal lobe ataxia characteristics, with some or all present.

- Difficulty in initiating movement
- Poor truncal mobility
- Falls due to minor balance disturbances
- Greatly hindered postural responses
- Characteristic magnetic gait, the inability to raise one's foot off of the floor.
- Wide base, poor balance control when in stance
- Short stride
- En bloc turns

Often patients with frontal lobe ataxia may experience minute cognitive changes that accompany the gait disturbances, such as frontal dementia and presentation of frontal release signs (Plantar reflex). Urinary incontinence may also be present. Bruns apraxia can be distinguished from Parkinsonian ataxia and cerebellar ataxia in a number of ways. Patients typically afflicted with Parkinsonian ataxia typically have irregular arm swing, a symptom not typically present in frontal ataxia. Walking stride in cerebellar ataxia varies dramatically, accompanied by erratic foot placement and sudden, uncontrolled lurching, not generally characteristic of Bruns apraxia.

== Cause ==
Frontal lobe ataxia is often associated with damage to the frontopontocerebellar tract (Arnold's bundle) that connects the frontal lobe to the cerebellum. This pathway normally sends information from the cortical regions to the cerebellum, particularly information used to initiate planned movement. Many neurologists describe frontal lobe ataxia as really an apraxia, in which voluntary control of initiating movement is greatly hindered, but normal movement is present when elicited involuntarily or reflexively. This indicates that cerebellar function is intact and that the presented symptoms of Bruns apraxia are due to damage located within frontal lobe regions and pathways leading from there to the cerebellum.

== Diagnosis ==
Diagnosis consists of a variety of tests, including but not limited to:

- Measurement of orthostatic blood pressure
- Coordination
  - rapid, alternating movements
  - stroking of heel along the opposite shin from knee to ankle
  - finger-to-nose testing.
- Primary sensory modalities are examined with the following methods, searching for focal sensory loss, graded distal sensory loss, or levels of decreased sensation, hyperesthesia or dysesthesia.
  - light touch
  - pin-prick
  - temperature
  - position
  - vibration
- Focused gait examination, which examines stationary position and walking abnormalities. Walking generally exposes any faults within the complex neurological communication between systems as weight is shifted from one foot to the other.

== Treatment ==
Treatment consists of physical rehabilitation programs designed to improve overall function, increase strength and improve balance. The ultimate goal is to increase the patient's degree of independence, thus improving the patient's quality of life. Exercise typically begins with simple movements, gradually transitioning into more complex actions.

=== Assessment of treatment ===
Various aspects of treatment are assessed based on the individual patient's condition, utilizing many assessment tools:

- Functional Reach Test
- External Perturbation Test – Push, Release
- External Perturbation Test – Pull
- Clinical Sensory Integration Test
- Single Leg Stance Test
- Five Times Sit to Stand Test

Various scales are also utilized

- Brief Ataxia Rating Scale
- Friedreich's ataxia Impact Scale
- Scale For Assessment and Rating of Ataxia
