= Magnetic gait =

Abnormal pattern of walking

Magnetic gait is a form of gait abnormality.

== Presentation ==
The person's feet seem attached to the floor as if by a magnet. In magnetic gait, each step is initiated in a "wresting" motion carrying feet upward and forward. Magnetic gait can be visualized in terms of a powerful magnet being forcefully pulled from a steel plate.

== Associated conditions ==
- Normal pressure hydrocephalus (NPH)

== See also ==
- Bruns ataxia
