= Thoracostomopsidae =

Scientific classification
- Domain: Eukaryota
- Kingdom: Animalia
- Phylum: Nematoda
- Class: Enoplea
- Order: Enoplida
- Family: Thoracostomopsidae

Family of nematodes

Thoracostomopsidae is a family of nematodes belonging to the order Enoplida.

Genera:

- Africanthion Inglis, 1964
- Cryptenoplus Riemann, 1966
- Enoploides Ssaweljev, 1912
- Enoplolaimus de Man, 1893
- Epacanthion Wieser, 1953
- Euthoracostomopsis Sergeeva, 1974
- Fenestrolaimus Filipjev, 1927
- Fleuronema Greenslade & Nicholas, 1991
- Filipjevia Kreis, 1928
- Hyptiolaimus Cobb, 1930
- Mesacanthion Filipjev, 1927
- Mesacanthoides Wieser, 1953
- Metenoploides Wieser, 1953
- Okranema Greenslade & Nicholas, 1991
- Oxyonchus Filipjev, 1927
- Paramesacanthion Wieser, 1953
- Parasaveljevia Wieser, 1953
- Parenoplus Filipjev, 1927
- Saveljevia Filipjev, 1925
- Thoracostomopsis Ditlevsen, 1918
- Trileptium Cobb, 1933
