= TRNA methyltransferase 10A =

Enzyme found in humans

TRMT10A

Identifiers
- Aliases: TRMT10A, HEL-S-88, RG9MTD2, TRM10, MSSGM, MSSGM1, tRNA methyltransferase 10A
- External IDs: OMIM: 616013; MGI: 1920421; GeneCards: TRMT10A
Available structures
PDB	Ortholog search: PDBe RCSB
PDB	List of PDB id codes 4FMW
Enzyme activity
EC #	BRENDA	ExPASy	KEGG	MetaCyc
2.1.1.221	↗	↗	↗	↗

Gene location (Human)
Chr.	Chromosome 4 (human)
Band	4q23	Start	99,546,709 bp
Band	4q23	End	99,564,039 bp

Gene location (Mouse)
Chr.	Chromosome 3 (mouse)
Band	3|3 G3	Start	137,849,209 bp
Band	3|3 G3	End	137,865,582 bp
RNA expression pattern
Bgee	Human / Mouse (ortholog); Top expressed in: gonad; testicle; Achilles tendon; islet of Langerhans; right uterine tube; body of pancreas; right lobe of liver; bronchial epithelial cell; mucosa of ileum; monocyte / Top expressed in: spermatocyte; spermatid; seminiferous tubule; primitive streak; genital tubercle; lumbar spinal ganglion; tail of embryo; otic placode; renal corpuscle; otic vesicle; More reference expression data
BioGPS	n/a
Gene ontology
Molecular function	methyltransferase activity; transferase activity; tRNA binding; RNA binding; tRNA (guanine-N1-)-methyltransferase activity; tRNA (guanine(9)-N(1))-methyltransferase activity
Cellular component	nucleolus; extracellular exosome; nucleus; nucleoplasm; cytosol; actin cytoskeleton; mitochondrion
Biological process	methylation; tRNA methylation; mitochondrial tRNA processing
Sources:Amigo / QuickGO
Orthologs
Databases	NCBI: entry; OMA: entry
Species	Human	Mouse
Entrez	93587	108943
Ensembl	ENSG00000145331	ENSMUSG00000004127
UniProt	Q8TBZ6	Q8C1Z8
RefSeq (mRNA)	NM_001134665; NM_001134666; NM_152292; NM_001375880; NM_001375881 NM_001375882	NM_175389; NM_001348196; NM_001348197
RefSeq (protein)	NP_001128137; NP_001128138; NP_689505; NP_001362809; NP_001362810 NP_001362811	NP_780598; NP_001335125; NP_001335126; NP_001391294; NP_001391297 NP_001391298; NP_001391299; NP_001391300; NP_001391301; NP_001391302; NP_001391303; NP_001391304; NP_001391305; NP_001391307; NP_001391308; NP_001391309; NP_001391310; NP_001391311; NP_001391312; NP_001391313; NP_001391314; NP_001391315
Location (UCSC)	Chr 4: 99.55 – 99.56 Mb	Chr 3: 137.85 – 137.87 Mb
PubMed search
- Wikidata
View/Edit Human	View/Edit Mouse

tRNA methyltransferase 10A is an enzyme that in humans is encoded by the TRM10 gene (previously RG9MTD2). As an enzyme it functions as a tRNA (guanine9-N1)-methyltransferase.
