= Plectidae =

Scientific classification
- Kingdom: Animalia
- Phylum: Nematoda
- Class: Chromadorea
- Order: Plectida
- Suborder: Plectina
- Superfamily: Plectoidea
- Family: Plectidae; Örley, 1880

Synonyms
- Anaplectidae Zell, 1993

Family of nematodes

Plectidae is a family of nematodes belonging to the order Plectida.

== Genera ==
Genera:

- Anaplectus De Coninck & Schuurmans Stekhoven, 1933
- Arctiplectus Andrássy, 2003
- Chiloplectus Andrássy, 1984
- Ereptonema Anderson, 1966
- Hemiplectus Zell, 1991
- Neotylocephalus Ali, Farooqui & Tejpal 1969
- Oligoplectus Taylor, 1935
- Parkia Yeats, 1967
- Perioplectus Gerlach & Reimann, 1973
- Plectus Bastian, 1865
- Pseudorhabdolaimus
- Tylocephalus Crossman, 1933
- Wilsonema Cobb, 1913
- Yeatesinia Holovachov & Boström, 2014
