= Oncholaimidae =

Scientific classification
- Domain: Eukaryota
- Kingdom: Animalia
- Phylum: Nematoda
- Class: Enoplea
- Order: Enoplida
- Superfamily: Oncholaimoidea
- Family: Oncholaimidae

Synonyms
- Pelagonematidae

Family of nematodes

Oncholaimidae is a family of nematodes belonging to the order Enoplida.

== Genera ==
- Admirandus Belogurov & Belogurova, 1979
- Adoncholaimus Filipjev, 1918
- Anoncholaimus Cobb, 1920
- Asymmetrella Cobb, 1920
- Bradybucca Schuurmans Stekhoven, 1956
- Cacolaimus Kreis, 1932
- Curvolaimus Wieser, 1953
- Dentolaimoides Khan, 1994
- Dioncholaimus Kreis, 1932
- Filoncholaimus Filipjev, 1927
- Fimbrilla Cobb, 1905
- Fotolaimus Belogurova & Belogurov, 1974
- Krampia Ditlevsen, 1921
- Kreisoncholaimus Rachor, 1969
- Metaparoncholaimus De Coninck & Schuurmans Stekhoven, 1933
- Metapelagonema Sergeeva, 1972
- Metoncholaimus Filipjev, 1918
- Meyersia Hopper, 1967
- Octonchus Clark, 1961
- Oloncholaimus Mordukhovich, Zograf, Saulenko & Fadeeva, 2020
- Oncholaimelloides Timm, 1969
- Oncholaimellus de Man, 1890
- Oncholaimoides Chitwood, 1937
- Oncholaimus Dujardin, 1845
- Paradoncholaimus Kreis, 1932
- Paroctonchus Shi & Xu, 2016
- Patagonema Pastor De Ward, Lo Russo & Villares, 2015
- Pelagonema Cobb, 1894
- Pelagonemella Kreis, 1932
- Phaenoncholaimus Kreis, 1934
- Phylloncholaimus Bussau, 1993
- Pontonema Leidy, 1855
- Prooncholaimus Micoletzky, 1924
- Pseudoncholaimus Kreis, 1932
- Pseudopelagonema Kreis, 1932
- Thalassogenus Andrássy, 1973
- Vasculonema Kreis, 1928
- Viscosia de Man, 1890
- Wiesoncholaimus Inglis, 1966
