= August Cramer =

Swiss-German neuropathologist and psychiatrist

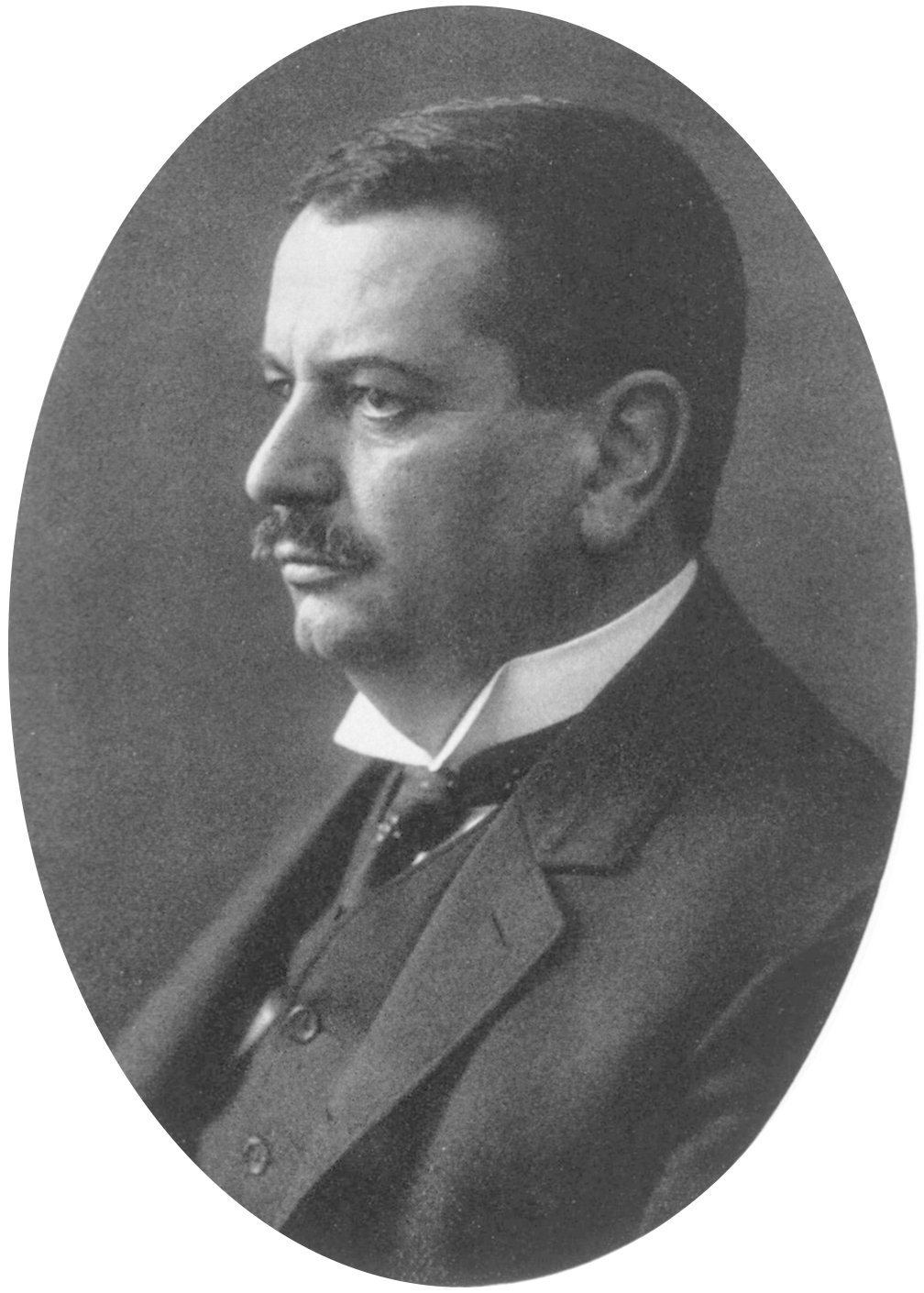
August Cramer (1860–1912)

Johann Baptist August Cramer (10 November 1860 – 5 September 1912) was a Swiss-German neuropathologist and psychiatrist who was a native of Pfäfers in the canton St. Gallen.

He studied medicine in Marburg and Freiburg, earning his medical doctorate in 1887. In 1889 be began work at a mental asylum in Eberswalde, and in 1895 received his habilitation in psychiatry at the University of Göttingen, where he subsequently became a professor and director of the psychiatric clinic. At Göttingen he helped establish the Provinzial-Jugendheim, an institution for treatment and education of psychopathic youth.

Cramer published numerous essays on clinical psychiatry, brain pathology, pathological anatomy, et al. Among his better known books were a treatise on forensic psychiatry titled Gerichtliche Psychiatrie. Ein Leitfaden für Mediziner und Juristen, and a textbook of nervous disorders in children that he co-authored with Ludwig Bruns (1858–1916) and Theodor Ziehen (1862–1950) called Handbuch der Nervenkrankheiten im Kindesalter.
