= Bastian–Bruns sign =

Clinical sign

The Bastian–Bruns sign, or Bastian-Bruns law, is the loss of tone and deep tendon reflexes in the lower limbs in the presence of complete transection of the spinal cord above the level of the lumbar enlargement. The sign was named after Henry Charlton Bastian and Ludwig Bruns.
