= Chronogastridae =

Scientific classification
- Domain: Eukaryota
- Kingdom: Animalia
- Phylum: Nematoda
- Class: Chromadorea
- Order: Plectida
- Family: Chronogastridae

Synonyms
- Chronogasteridae

Family of roundworms

Chronogastridae is a family of nematodes belonging to the order Plectida.

Genera:

- Caribplectus Andrássy, 1973
- Keralanema Siddiqi, 2003
- Kischkenema Siddiqi, Winiszewska & Malewski, 2013
- Rugoster Siddiqi, Handoo & Siddiqi, 2013
