= Plectida =

Scientific classification
- Kingdom: Animalia
- Phylum: Nematoda
- Class: Chromadorea
- Subclass: Chromadoria
- Order: Plectida; Gadea, 1973

Order of roundworms

Plectida is an order of nematodes belonging to the class Chromadorea.

Families:

- Aegialoalaimidae Lorenzen, 1981
- Camacolaimidae De Coninck & Schuurmans Stekhoven, 1933
- Chronogastridae Gagarin, 1975
- Haliplectidae Chitwood, 1951
- Metateratocephalidae Eroshenko, 1973
- Peresianidae Vitiello & De Coninck, 1968
- Plectidae Örley, 1880
