= Enoplidae =

Scientific classification
- Domain: Eukaryota
- Kingdom: Animalia
- Phylum: Nematoda
- Class: Enoplea
- Order: Enoplida
- Family: Enoplidae

Synonyms
- Enophidae

Family of roundworms

Enoplidae is a family of nematodes belonging to the order Enoplida.

== Genera ==
Genera:

- Enoplus Dujardin, 1845
- Hyalacanthion Wieser, 1959
- Lineolia Gerlach & Riemann, 1974
- Palaeoenoploides Mattavelli & Bracchi, 2008
- Ruamowhitia Yeates, 1967
- Savaljevia Filipjev, 1927
- Starobogatovia Platonova, 1984
