= Rhabdolaimidae =

Scientific classification
- Domain: Eukaryota
- Kingdom: Animalia
- Phylum: Nematoda
- Class: Chromadorea
- Order: Araeolaimida
- Family: Rhabdolaimidae

Family of roundworms

Rhabdolaimidae is a family of nematodes belonging to the order Araeolaimida.

Genera:

- Mediolaimus Tahseen, Sultana, Khan & Hussain, 2012
- Rhabdolaimus de Man, 1880
- Rogerus Hoeppli & Chu, 1934
- Syringolaimus de Man, 1888
- Udonchus Cobb, 1913
