= TRNA (adenine9-N1)-methyltransferase =

TRNA (adenine^{9}-N^{1})-methyltransferase

Identifiers
- EC no.: 2.1.1.218

Databases
- IntEnz: IntEnz view
- BRENDA: BRENDA entry
- ExPASy: NiceZyme view
- KEGG: KEGG entry
- MetaCyc: metabolic pathway
- PRIAM: profile
- PDB structures: RCSB PDB PDBe PDBsum
Search
- PMC: articles
- PubMed: articles
- NCBI: proteins

TRNA (adenine^{9}-N^{1})-methyltransferase (EC 2.1.1.218, Trm10p, tRNA(m1G9/m1A9)-methyltransferase, tRNA(m1G9/m1A9)MTase, TK0422p (gene), tRNA m1A9-methyltransferase, tRNA m1A9 Mtase) is an enzyme with systematic name S-adenosyl-L-methionine:tRNA (adenine^{9}-N^{1})-methyltransferase. This enzyme catalyses the following chemical reaction

S-adenosyl-L-methionine + adenine^{9} in tRNA $\rightleftharpoons$ S-adenosyl-L-homocysteine + N^{1}-methyladenine^{9} in tRNA

The enzyme from Sulfolobus acidocaldarius specifically methylates adenine^{9} in tRNA.
