= Ironidae =

Scientific classification
- Kingdom: Animalia
- Phylum: Nematoda
- Class: Enoplea
- Order: Enoplida
- Superfamily: Ironoidea
- Family: Ironidae de Man, 1876

Family of roundworms

Ironidae is a family of nematodes belonging to the order Enoplida.

== Genera ==
Genera:

- Capillaris
- Conilia Gerlach, 1956
- Criptonchus Cobb, 1913
- Trissonchulus Cobb, 1920
