= Benthimermithida =

Scientific classification
- Domain: Eukaryota
- Kingdom: Animalia
- Phylum: Nematoda
- Class: Chromadorea
- Order: Benthimermithida

Order of roundworms

Benthimermithida is an order of nematodes belonging to the class Chromadorea.

Families:

- Benthimermithidae Petter, 1980
