= TRNA (guanine9-N1)-methyltransferase =

Class of enzymes

tRNA (guanine^{9}-N^{1})-methyltransferase

Identifiers
- EC no.: 2.1.1.221

Databases
- BRENDA: enzyme data
- ExPASy: NiceZyme view
- KEGG: enzyme entry
- MetaCyc: metabolic pathway
- Rhea: reactions
- PDB structures: RCSB PDB PDBe PDBsum
Search
- PMC: articles
- PubMed: articles
- NCBI: proteins

tRNA (guanine^{9}-N^{1})-methyltransferase (EC 2.1.1.221) is an enzyme with systematic name S-adenosyl-L-methionine:tRNA (guanine^{9}-N^{1})-methyltransferase. This enzyme catalyses the following chemical reaction

S-adenosyl-L-methionine + guanine^{9} in tRNA $\rightleftharpoons$ S-adenosyl-L-homocysteine + N^{1}-methylguanine^{9} in tRNA

The enzyme from Saccharomyces cerevisiae specifically methylates guanine^{9}. In humans, isozymes have been found encoded by the genes TRMT10A, TRMT10B, and TRMT10C.

== Alternative names ==
Various names have been associated with enzyme, including Trm10p, tRNA(m1G9/m1A9)-methyltransferase, tRNA(m1G9/m1A9)MTase, tRNA (guanine-N(1)-)-methyltransferase, tRNA m1G9-methyltransferase, and tRNA m1G9 MTase.
