= Tripylidae =

Scientific classification
- Kingdom: Animalia
- Phylum: Nematoda
- Class: Enoplea
- Order: Enoplida
- Family: Tripylidae de Man, 1876

Synonyms
- Triplyidae

Family of nematodes

Tripylidae is a family of nematodes belonging to the order Enoplida.

== Genera ==
Genera:

- Abunema Khera, 1971
- Andrassya Brzeski, 1960
- Anguillula Ehrenberg, 1831
- Tobrilia Andrássy, 1967
- Tripyla Bastian, 1865
- Tripylella Brzeski & Winiszewska-Slipinska, 1993
