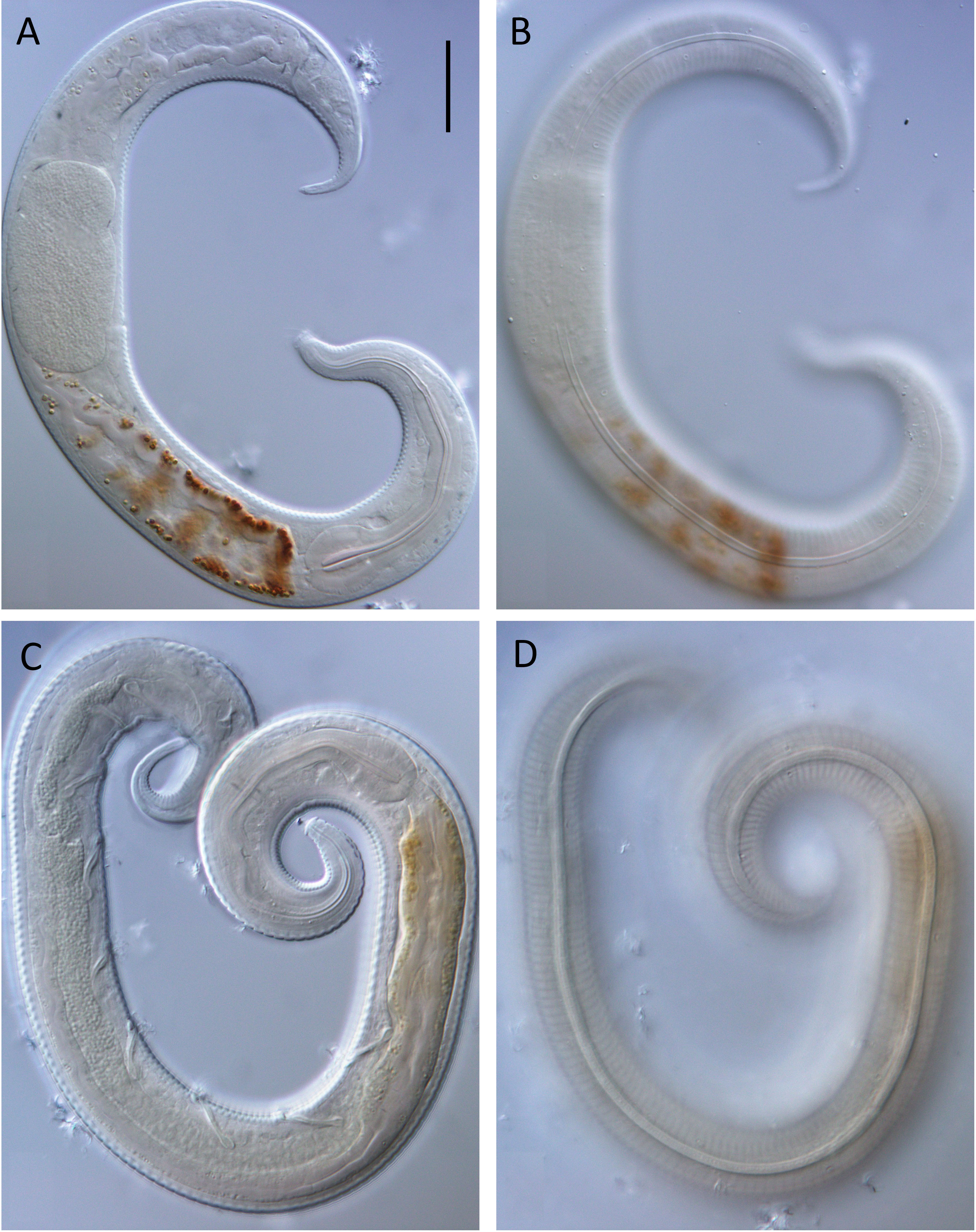
- Leptolaimus dififtinus

Scientific classification
- Domain: Eukaryota
- Kingdom: Animalia
- Phylum: Nematoda
- Class: Chromadorea
- Order: Araeolaimida
- Family: Leptolaimidae

Synonyms
- Halaphanolaimidae; Peresianidae

= Leptolaimidae =

Family of roundworms

Leptolaimidae is a family of nematodes belonging to the order Araeolaimida.

== Genera ==
Genera:

- Anguilloides
- Anomonema Hopper, 1963
- Anthonema Cobb, 1906
- Antomicron Cobb, 1920
- Leptolaimoides Vitiello, 1971
- Leptolaimus de Man, 1876
- Leptoplectonema Coomans & Raski, 1991
- Manunema Gerlach, 1957
- Paraphanolaimus Nicoletzky, 1923
- Paraplectonema Strand, 1934
- Prodomorganus Gagarin, 1993
