= Henry Charlton Bastian =

British physician (1837–1915)

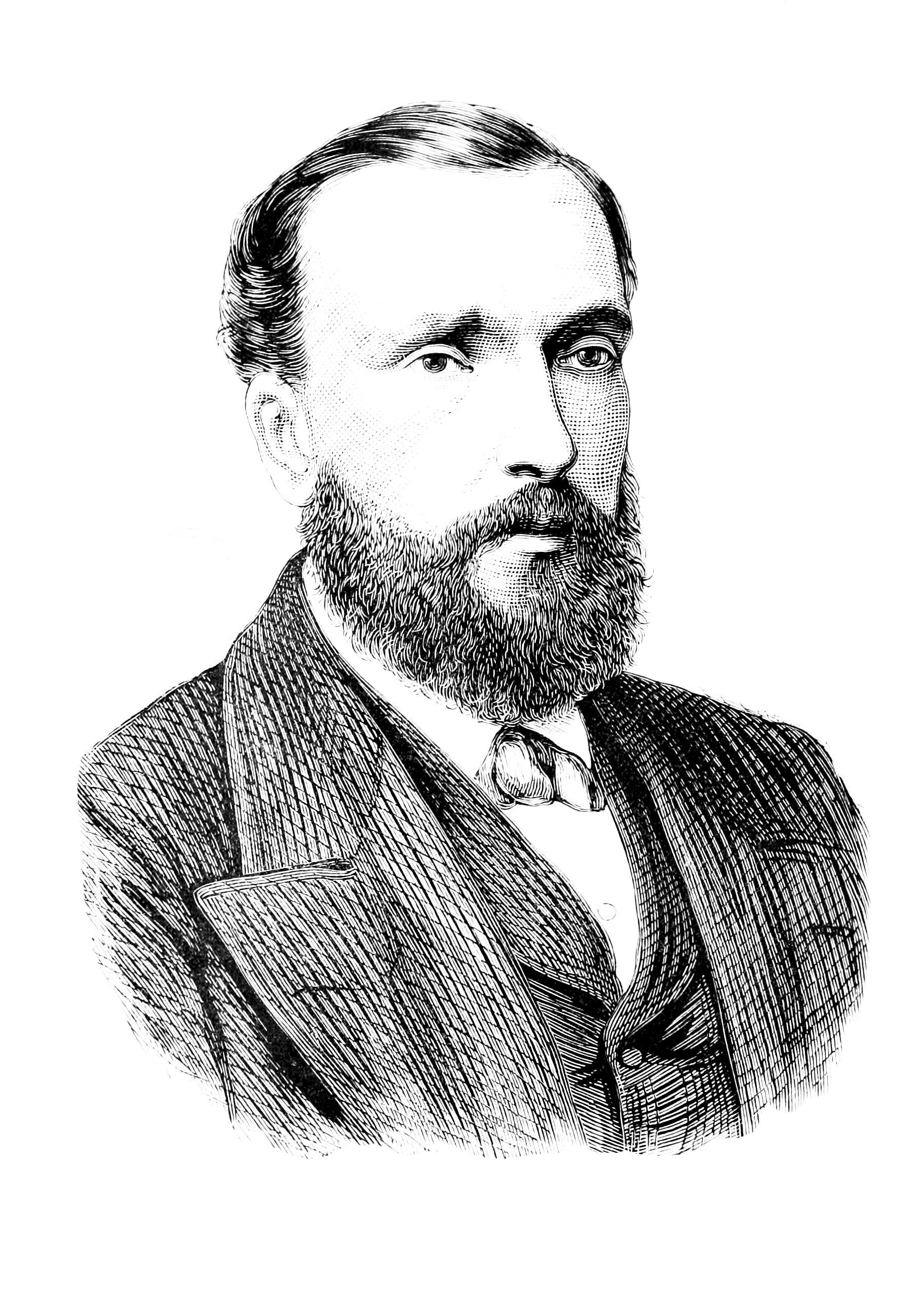
Portrait of Bastian published in The Popular Science Monthly in 1875

Henry Charlton Bastian (26 April 1837 in Truro, Cornwall, England – 17 November 1915 in Chesham Bois, Buckinghamshire) was an English physiologist and neurologist.

== Biography ==
Bastian was born at Truro, Cornwall and graduated from University of London in 1861. He obtained his M.D. in 1866. He was elected a Fellow of the Royal Society in 1868 and a Fellow of the Royal College of Physicians in 1870.

In 1867, Bastian was elected Professor of Pathology and Assistant Physician at UCL Medical School and successively became Professor of Clinical Medicine at UCL Medical School. In 1868, he became assistant physician to the National Hospital for the Paralysed and Epileptic, then full physician in 1887. He served at the National Hospital until he retired in 1912.

He was an advocate of the doctrine of archebiosis. He believed he witnessed the spontaneous generation of living organisms out of non living matter under his microscope and therefore argued against the concept of germ theory. He promoted a theory of "heterogenesis", a process by which existing living beings give birth to wholly different forms. Bastian's criticism of the germ theory of disease has been linked to the theory's initially slow impact in the UK. The term biogenesis was coined by Henry Bastian.

== Works ==
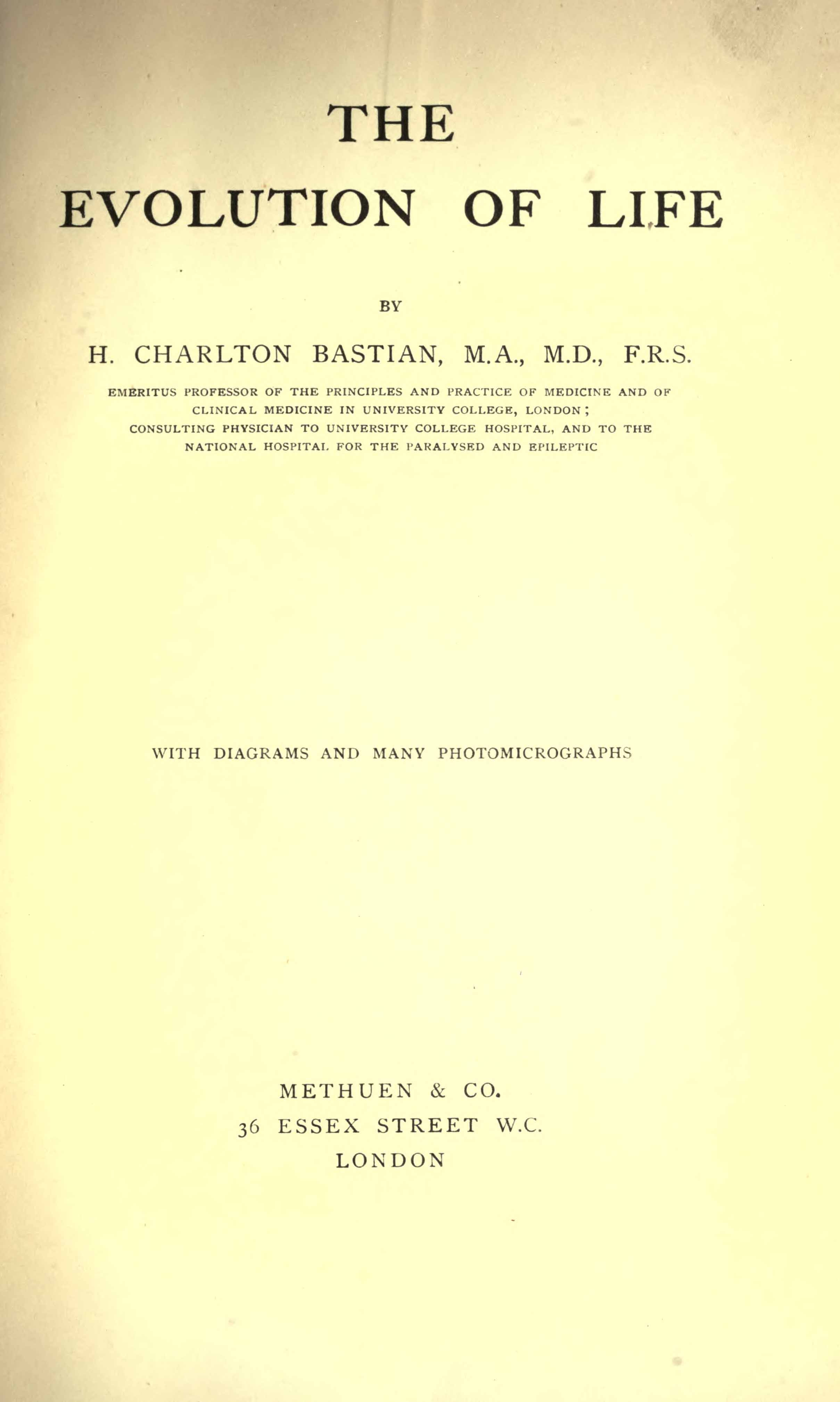
The Evolution of Life, 1907

- Monograph of the Anguillulidae (1865)
- The Modes of Origin of Lowest Organisms (1871)
- The Beginnings of Life: Being Some Account of the Nature, Modes of Origin and Transformation of Lower Organisms, I–II (1872)
- Evolution and the Origin of Life (1874)
- The Brain as an Organ of Mind (1880)
- The "muscular sense" its nature and cortical localisation (1887)
- A Treatise on Aphasia and Other Speech Defects (1898)
- Studies in Heterogenesis (1903)
- The Nature and Origin of Living Matter (1905)
- The Evolution of Life (1907)
- The Origin of Life (1911)

== See also ==
- Bastian-Bruns law or Bastian-Bruns sign
- Receptive aphasia
