= Enoplida =

Scientific classification
- Kingdom: Animalia
- Phylum: Nematoda
- Class: Enoplea
- Subclass: Enoplia
- Order: Enoplida; Filipjev, 1929

Families
- See text

Order of roundworms

Enoplida is an order of nematodes. It is one of two orders in Enoplia, which is one of two subclasses in Class Enoplea.

These nematodes are mostly free-living marine animals. Most feed on diatoms and other algae.

== Subdivisions ==
Upon phylogenetic analysis in 2010, the order was divided into five clades. Clades and selected families include:

- Clade I
  - Family Rhabdolaimidae
- Clade II
  - Family Alaimidae
  - Family Ironidae
- Clade III
  - Family Tripyloididae
  - Family Trefusiidae
- Clade IV
  - Family Oxystominidae
  - Family Oncholaimidae
  - Family Enchelidiidae
- Clade V
  - Family Thoracostomopsidae
  - Family Enoplidae
  - Family Phanodermatidae
  - Family Leptosomatidae

The World Register of Marine Species shows the following suborders within Enoplida:

- Alaimina
- Campydorina
- Dioctophymina
- Enoplina
- Ironina
- Oncholaimina
- Trefusiina
- Trichinellina
- Tripyloidina

== Bibliography ==
- Blaxter, Mark L.; De Ley, Paul; Garey, James R.; Liu, Leo X.; Scheldeman, Patsy; Vierstraete, Andy; Vanfleteren, Jacques R.; Mackey, Laura Y.; Dorris, Mark; Frisse, Linda M.; Vida, J. T.; Thomas, W. Kelley (5 March 1998). "A molecular evolutionary framework for the phylum Nematoda". Nature. 392 (6671): 71–75. doi:10.1038/32160. PMID 9510248. S2CID 4301939.
- Lee, Donald L, ed. (2010). The biology of nematodes. London: Taylor & Francis. ISBN 978-0415272117.
