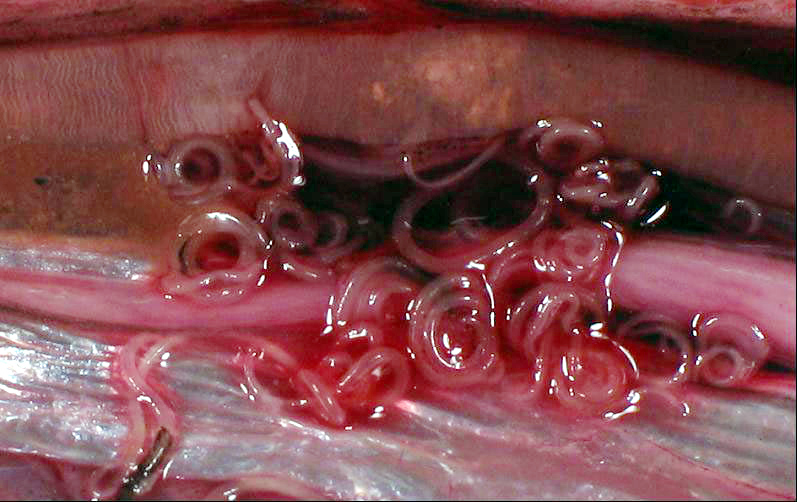
- Anisakid larvae in the body cavity of an Atlantic herring

Scientific classification
- Kingdom: Animalia
- Phylum: Nematoda
- Class: Chromadorea; Inglis, 1983
- Subclass: Chromadoria; Pearse, 1942

= Chromadorea =

Class of roundworms

The Chromadorea are a class of the roundworm phylum, Nematoda. They contain a single subclass (Chromadoria) and several orders. With such a redundant arrangement, the Chromadoria are liable to be divided if the orders are found to form several clades, or abandoned if they are found to constitute a single radiation.

Formerly, they were treated as a subclass in the paraphyletic "Adenophorea" assemblage, which has been mostly abandoned by modern authors. It is also suspected that the Chromadorea may not be monophyletic as delimited here; at least the Monhysterida seem to be a distinct and far more ancient lineage than the rest.

== Appearance ==
Members of this class' bodies usually have annules, their amphids elaborate and spiral, and they all have three esophageal glands. They usually live in marine sediments, although they can live elsewhere. They have a more sophisticated pharynx than most roundworms.

Members of this class can be identified by the presence of eight conserved signature indels (CSIs) exclusively shared by the class. These molecular markers are found in essential proteins such as tRNA (guanine-N(1))-methyltransferase and can serve as a reliable molecular method of distinguishing the Chromadorea from other classes within the phylum Nematoda.

== Orders ==
Provisionally, the following orders are placed here:

- Araeolaimida
- Ascaridida
- Chromadorida
- Desmodorida
- Desmoscolecida
- Monhysterida
- Rhabditida
- Rhigonematida
- Leptoaimida

=== Notes ===
The Benthimermithida are also occasionally placed here.

The Ascaridida appear to be nested within Rhabditida.
