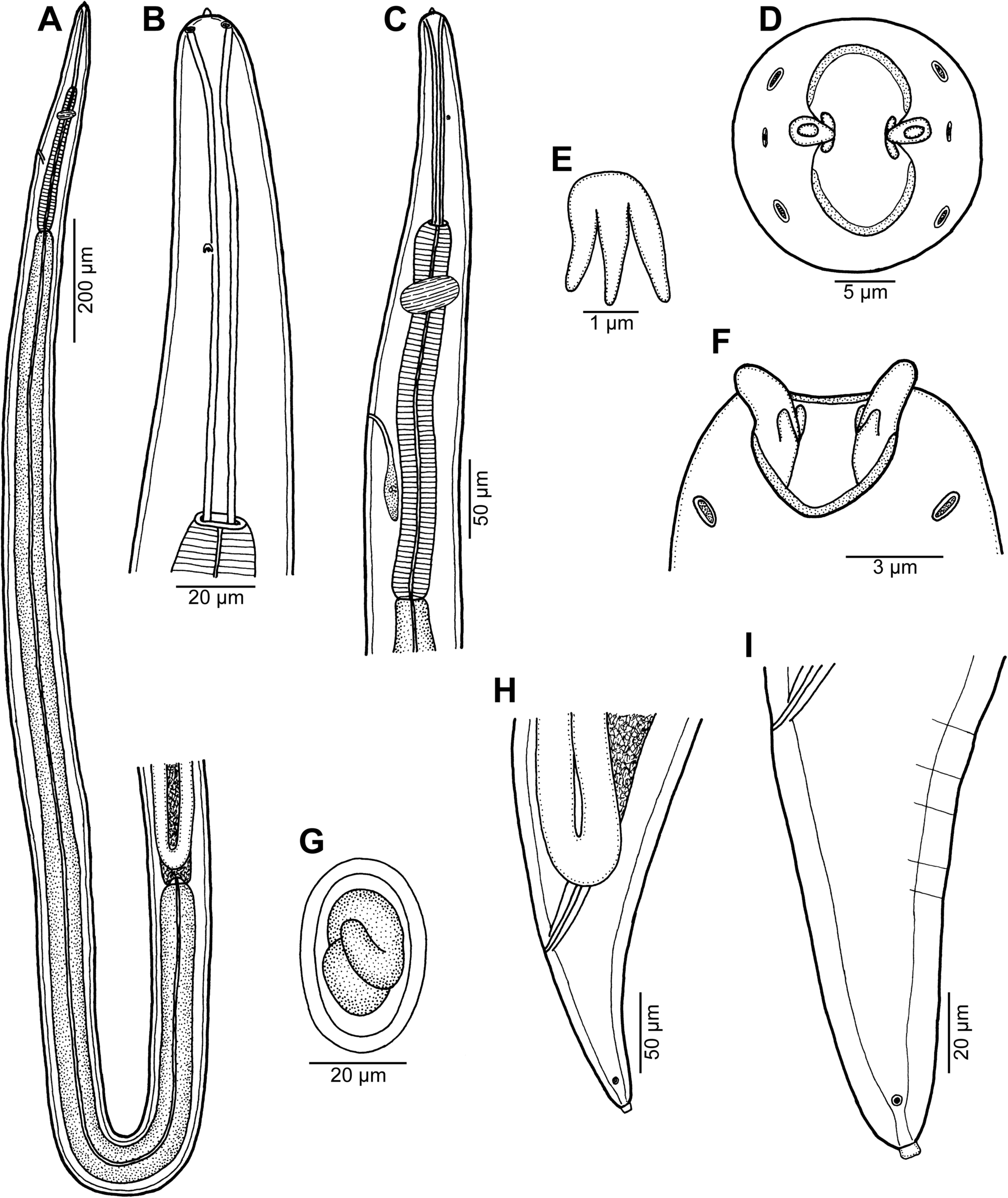
- Ascarophisnema tridentatum

Scientific classification
- Domain: Eukaryota
- Kingdom: Animalia
- Phylum: Nematoda
- Class: Chromadorea
- Order: Rhabditida
- Family: Cystidicolidae
- Genus: Ascarophisnema; Moravec & Justine, 2010
- Species: A. tridentatum

Binomial name
- Ascarophisnema tridentatum Moravec & Justine, 2010

= Ascarophisnema =

Genus of worms

Ascarophisnema is a genus of parasitic nematodes, belonging to the family Cystidicolidae. Species of Ascarophisnema are parasitic as adults in the gastrointestinal tract of fish. According to the World Register of Marine Species, the genus currently (2019) includes a single species, Ascarophisnema tridentatum.

== Etymology ==
The generic name consists of two parts, Ascarophis (the name of a similar genus) and nema (= nematode). Ascarophisnema is a neuter gender.

== Hosts and localities ==
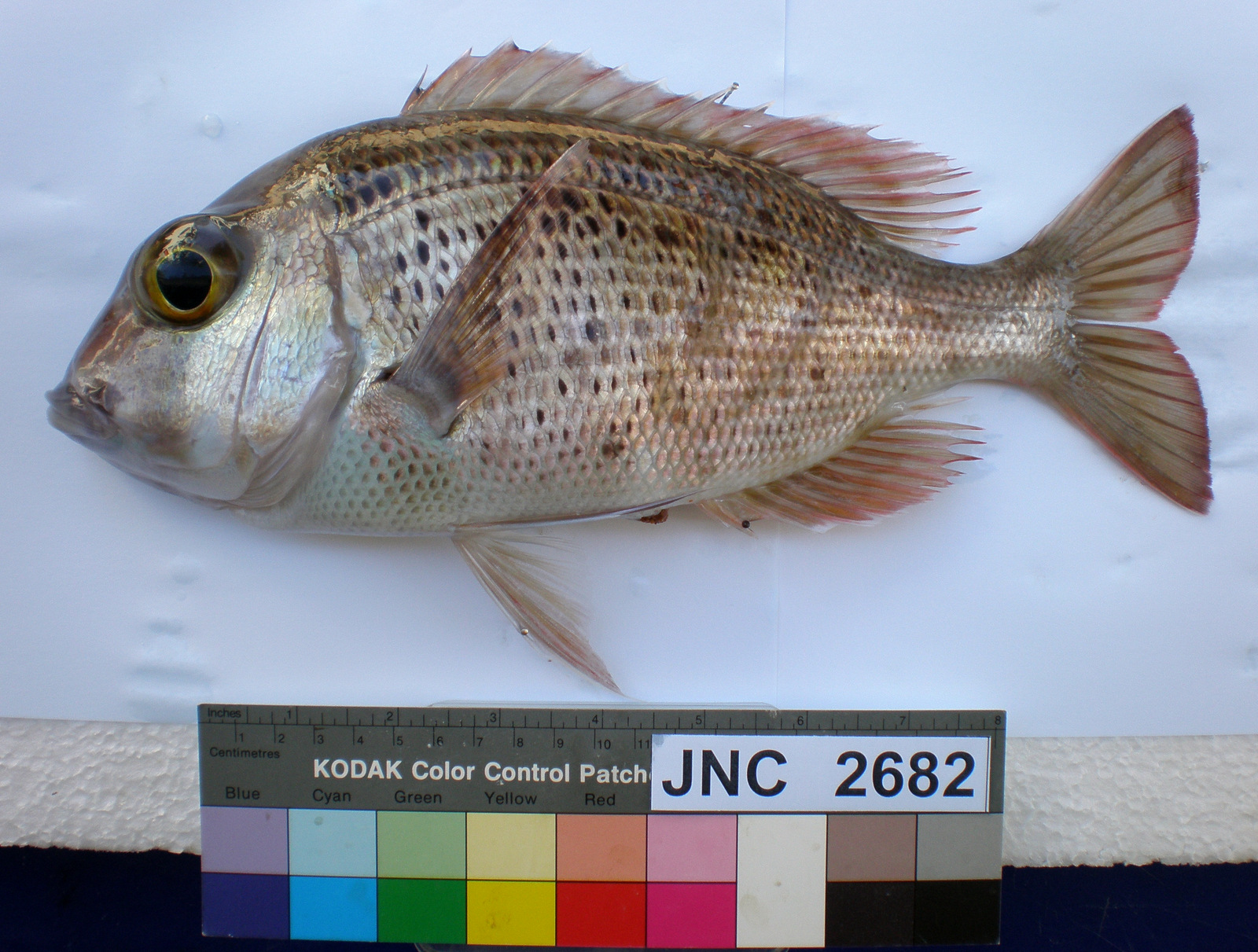
Gymnocranius euanus is the host of Ascarophisnema tridentatum

Ascarophisnema tridentatum Moravec & Justine, 2010 is a parasite of the stomach of the fish Gymnocranius euanus (Lethrinidae, Perciformes) in the coral reef lagoon of New Caledonia. It has also been recorded from the stomach of the fish Gymnocranius grandoculis in the same locality.
