= Spinitectoides =

Scientific classification
- Domain: Eukaryota
- Kingdom: Animalia
- Phylum: Nematoda
- Class: Chromadorea
- Order: Rhabditida
- Family: Cystidicolidae
- Genus: Spinitectoides; Petter, 1969
- Species: S. berlandi

Binomial name
- Spinitectoides berlandi Petter, 1969

Genus of worms

Spinitectoides is a genus of parasitic nematodes, belonging to the family Cystidicolidae. Species of Spinitectoides are parasitic as adults in the gastrointestinal tract of fish. According to the World Register of Marine Species, the genus currently (2019) includes a single species, Spinitectoides berlandi.

== Description ==
The genus Spinitectoides is known only from larvae and females; its main characteristics are "a festooned cuticular ornament on the anterior part of body and an apical structure closely similar to this of Cystidicola".

Spinitectoides berlandi was described on the basis of one larva from Trisopterus luscus and three adult females from Molva molva. No males were found. The description also mentions that females from Molva molva had been previously described by Berland under the name "Spinitectus sp.".

== Etymology ==
The etymology is not clearly explained in the original description but it is obvious that the name of the genus refers to Spinitectus, another genus of Cystidicolidae. The specific epithet berlandi obviously refers to Bjørn Berland, a Norwegian parasitologist who described similar specimens in 1961.

== Hosts and localities ==
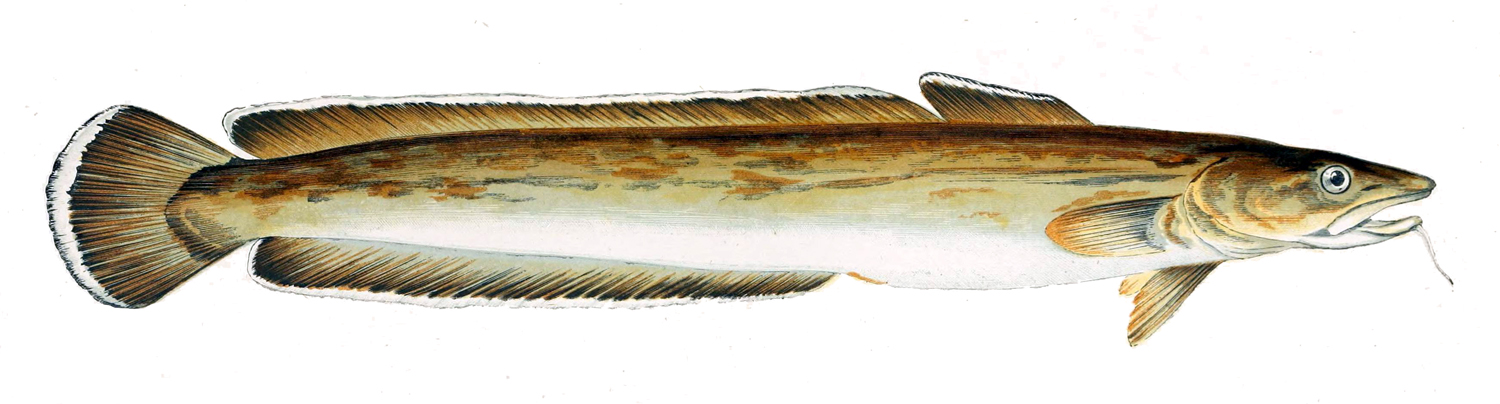
The common ling, Molva molva is the host of Spinitectoides berlandi

Spinitectoides berlandi is a parasite of marine fish, including pouting, Trisopterus luscus (Gadidae) and common ling, Molva molva (Lotidae). The type-locality is the Atlantic Ocean off the French coast. Other localities include off the Norwegian coast and off Faroe Islands.
