= Metabronemoides =

Scientific classification
- Kingdom: Animalia
- Phylum: Nematoda
- Class: Chromadorea
- Order: Rhabditida
- Family: Cystidicolidae
- Genus: Metabronemoides; Moravec & Justine, 2010

Genus of worms

Metabronemoides is a genus of parasitic nematodes, belonging to the family Cystidicolidae. Species of Metabronemoides are parasitic as adults in the gastrointestinal tract of fish.

== Etymology ==
The generic name Metabronemoides (= Metabronema-like, resembling Metabronema) reflects the fact that the cephalic structure of these nematodes somewhat recalls that of species of Metabronema. Metabronemoides is a masculine gender.

== Species ==
According to the World Register of Marine Species, the genus currently (2019) includes a single species:

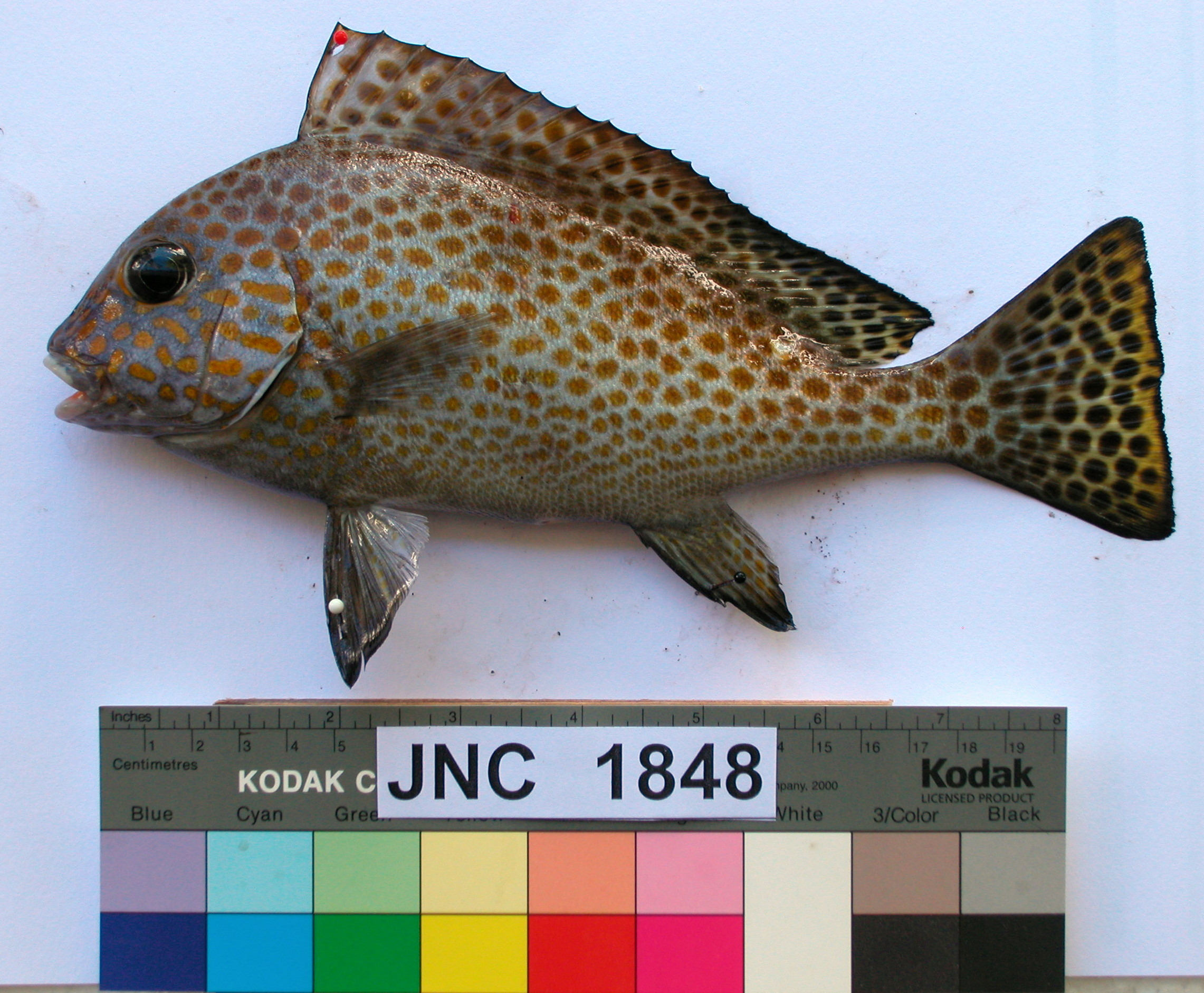
Diagramma pictum is the host of Metabronemoides mirabilis

- Metabronemoides mirabilis Moravec & Justine, 2010

This species is a parasite of the stomach of the painted sweetlips Diagramma pictum (Haemulidae, Perciformes), a fish of the coral reef lagoon of New Caledonia. The name of the species mirabilis (= admirable, remarkable) relates to the fact that it has a remarkably different cephalic structure as compared to other representatives of Cystidicolidae.
