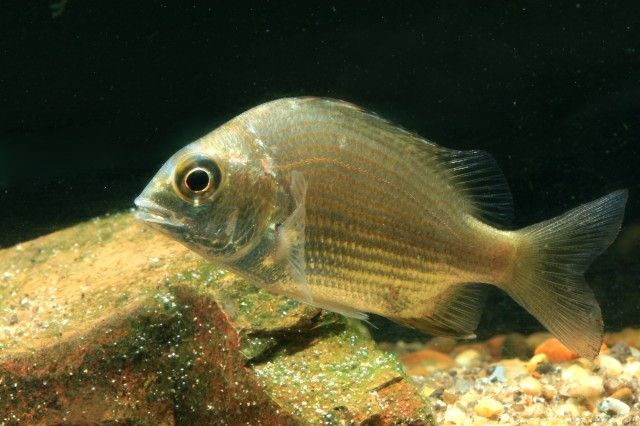

Conservation status
- Least Concern (IUCN 3.1)

Scientific classification
- Kingdom: Animalia
- Phylum: Chordata
- Class: Actinopterygii
- Order: Acanthuriformes
- Family: Lethrinidae
- Genus: Gymnocranius
- Species: G. griseus

Binomial name
- Gymnocranius griseus (Temminck & Schlegel, 1843)

Synonyms
- Dentex griseus Temminck & Schlegel, 1843; Lobotes microprion Bleeker, 1851; Gymnocranius orbis Fowler, 1938

= Gymnocranius griseus =

Species of fish

Gymnocranius griseus, the grey large-eye bream, barred large-eye bream, grey emperor, grey seabream and naked-head seabream, is a species of marine ray-finned fish belonging to the family Lethrinidae, the emperors and emperor breams. This species is found in the Indian and Pacific Oceans.

== Taxonomy ==
Gymnocranius griseus was first formally described as Dentex grisues by Coenraad Jacob Temminck and Hermann Schlegel with its type locality given as the southwestern coast of Japan. Some authors place the genus Gymnocranius in the subfamily Monotaxinae but the 5th edition of Fishes of the World does not recognise the subfamilies traditionally accepted within the family Lethrinidae as valid. The family Lethrinidae is classified by the 5th edition of Fishes of the World as belonging to the order Spariformes.

== Etymology ==
Gymnocranius griseus has the specific name griseus which means "grey", Temminck and Schlegel described the fish as having a "very pale bluish grey" colour in life.

== Description ==
Gymnocranius griseus has its dorsal fin supported by 10 spines and 10 soft rays while the anal fin has 3 spines and 9 or 10 soft rays. It has an oblong shaped body with a depth which fits into its standard length between 1.9 and 2.3 times. The snout is pointed and the front of the jaw has three pairs of canine like teeth, with the other teeth being bristle-like, although they become more conical along the sides. The caudal fin is moderately forked and has pointed tips to its lobes. This is a silvery coloured bream with between5 and 8 slender black vertical bars on the flanks with the first running through the eye and across the cheek. This species has a maximum published total length of 35 cm (14 in), although 25 cm (9.8 in) is more typical.

== Distribution and habitat ==
Gymnocranius griseus is found in the Western Pacific Ocean from southern Japan south into the Malay Archipelago and from western Australia east to the Marianas Islands. It has been claimed from the Indian Ocean but these records are likely to be misidentifications of G. grandoculis. This species is found in inshore waters at depths greater than 20 m (66 ft) in sheltered bays and on sand and mud slopes. Juveniles are occasionally found on algal reefs in brackish estuaries.
