= Prospinitectus =

Scientific classification
- Domain: Eukaryota
- Kingdom: Animalia
- Phylum: Nematoda
- Class: Chromadorea
- Order: Rhabditida
- Family: Cystidicolidae
- Genus: Prospinitectus; Petter, 1979

Genus of worms

Prospinitectus is a genus of parasitic nematodes, belonging to the family Cystidicolidae. Species of Prospinitectus are parasitic as adults in the gastrointestinal tract of Tuna fish.

== Species ==
According to the World Register of Marine Species, the genus currently (2019) includes two species:

- Prospinitectus exiguus Crites, Overstreet & Maung, 1993
- Prospinitectus mollis (Mamaev, 1968) Petter, 1979 (Type-species)

== Description ==
The type-species of the genus, Prospinitectus mollis was first described as Spinitectus mollis Mamaev, 1968, and redescribed from two males by Petter in 1979. The genus was differentiated on the base of several morphological characters, including the pseudolabiae, the buccal capsule, the cuticle with spines arranged as rings, the number of papillae in the male and the spicules.

== Etymology ==
The etymology of Prospinitectus is not clearly explained in the original description but is obvious that the name of the genus refers to Spinitectus, another genus of Cystidicolidae.
