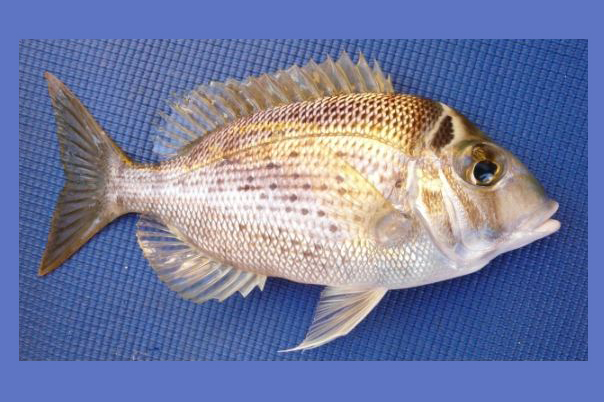

Conservation status
- Least Concern (IUCN 3.1)

Scientific classification
- Kingdom: Animalia
- Phylum: Chordata
- Class: Actinopterygii
- Order: Acanthuriformes
- Family: Lethrinidae
- Genus: Gymnocranius
- Species: G. audleyi

Binomial name
- Gymnocranius audleyi J. D. Ogilby, 1916

Synonyms
- Gymnocranius bitorquatus Cockerell, 1916

= Gymnocranius audleyi =

Species of fish

Gymnocranius audleyi, the collared large-eye bream, collar bream, bastard bream, coral bream, iodine bream, pale-faced bream or sand snapper, is a species of marine ray-finned fish belonging to the family Lethrinidae, the emperors and emperor breams. This species is found in the Western Pacific Ocean.

== Taxonomy ==
Gymnocranius audleyi was first formally described in 1916 by the Australian herpetologist and ichthyologist James Douglas Ogilby with its type locality given as Snapper Banks off Moreton Bay in Queensland, Australia. Some authors place the genus Gymnocranius in the subfamily Monotaxinae but the 5th edition of Fishes of the World does not recognise the subfamilies traditionally accepted within the family Lethrinidae as valid. The family Lethrinidae is classified by the 5th edition of Fishes of the World as belonging to the order Spariformes.

== Etymology ==
Gymnocranius audleyi has a specific name which honours Ogilby's friend Audley Raymond Jones, to whom Ogilby was "indebted for much interesting information regarding the habits of fishes".

== Description ==
Gymnocranius audleyi has an oblong shaped body which has a depth that fits into its standard length between 2.2 and 2.4 times. The snout is quite steep and there is a bony ridge on the nape in adults. It has a large eye but its length is less than the length of the snout. The continuous dorsal fin is supported by 10 spines and 10 soft rays while the anal fin contains 3 spines and 9 or 10 soft rays. There are no scales on the inner base of the pectoral fin. The overall colour is pale silvery, olive or bronze, paler on the lower body. Spots on the scales and flanks create very thin longitudinal rows. The fins are yellowish and there is an obvious darker patch of scales behind the upper part of the eye. The face in scaleless and there is soemtine a dark bar running through the eye. This species has a maximum published total length of 40 cm (16 in), although 35 cm (14 in) is more typical.

== Distribution and habitat ==
Gymnocranius audleyi is found in the southwestern Pacific Ocean off eastern Australia from off Port Douglas in the north to Sydney Harbour in New South Wales, it also occurs around Lord Howe Island, the Chesterfield Islands and New Caledonia. It is a solitary species found in sandy and rubble parts of the seabed in the vicinity of reefs.
