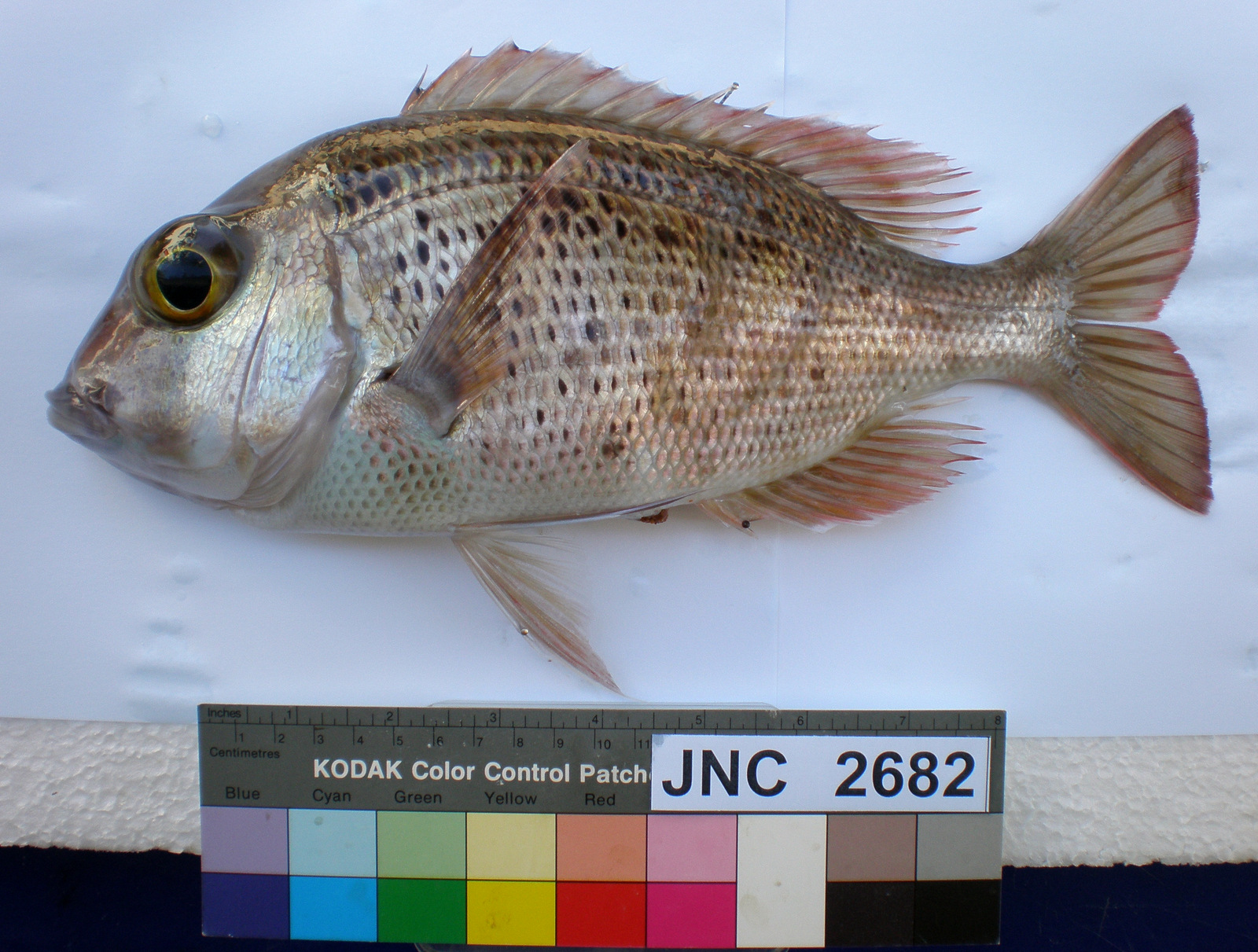
- Gymnocranius euanus

Scientific classification
- Kingdom: Animalia
- Phylum: Chordata
- Class: Actinopterygii
- Division: Teleostei
- Order: Acanthuriformes
- Family: Lethrinidae
- Genus: Gymnocranius; Klunzinger, 1870

Type species
- Dentex rivulatus Rüppell, 1838

Synonyms
- Paradentex Bleeker, 1872

= Gymnocranius =

Genus of fishes

Gymnocranius is a genus of marine ray-finned fishes belonging to the family Lethrinidae, the emperors and emperor breams. These fishes are found in the Indian Ocean and the western Pacific Ocean.

== Taxonomy ==
Gymnocranius was first proposed as a monospecific genus by the German zoologist Carl Benjamin Klunzinger in 1870 with Dentex rivulatus as its only species. Dentex rivulatus had been described by Eduard Rüppell in 1838 with its type locality given as Jeddah but this has subsequently been found to be a synonym of Cantharus grandoculis described in 1830 by Achille Valenciennes from the Seychelles. Some authors place this genus in the subfamily Monotaxinae but the 5th edition of Fishes of the World does not recognise the subfamilies traditionally accepted within the family Lethrinidae as valid. The family Lethrinidae is classified by the 5th edition of Fishes of the World as belonging to the order Spariformes.

== Etymology ==
Gymnocranius means "naked skull" and it was originally a subgenus of Dentex distinguished by having no scales on the crown.

== Species ==
There are currently eleven recognized species in this genus, but more species are awaiting description.

- Gymnocranius audleyi J. D. Ogilby, 1916 (Collar Seabream)
- Gymnocranius elongatus Senta, 1973 (Forktail large-eye bream)
- Gymnocranius euanus (Günther, 1879) (Japanese large-eye bream)
- Gymnocranius frenatus Bleeker, 1873 (Yellowsnout large-eye bream)
- Gymnocranius grandoculis (Valenciennes, 1830) (Robinson's Seabream)
- Gymnocranius griseus (Temminck & Schlegel, 1843) (Grey Sea bream)
- Gymnocranius microdon (Bleeker, 1851) (Blue-spotted Seabream)
- Gymnocranius obesus W. J. Chen, Miki & Borsa, 2017 (Obese large-eye bream)
- Gymnocranius oblongus Borsa, Béarez & W. J. Chen, 2010 (Oblong large-eye bream)
- Gymnocranius satoi Borsa, Béarez, Paijo & W. J. Chen, 2013 (Sato's large-eye bream)
- Gymnocranius superciliosus Borsa, Béarez, Paijo & W. J. Chen, 2013 (Eyebrowed large-eye bream)

== Characteristics ==
Gymoncranius fishes are medium to large breams, have oval shaped, laterally compressed bodies with a convex profile in front of the eye and a steeply sloping snout. In adults there is frequently a bony ridge on the nape and a bony shelf above the front of the eye. They have a continuous dorsal fin supported by 10 spines and 10 soft rays and the anal fin has 3 spines and 10 soft rays. The pectoral fin contains 14 fin rays. The cheek has between 3 and 6 transverse scale rows There are no scales on the inner axilla of the pectoral fin. There are canine-like and bristle-like teeth on the outer row of the sides of both jaws. The outer surface of the maxilla is smooth. The caudal fin is typically forked with pinted lobs, The typical colour is mostly silver with some markings. The blue-lined large eyed bream (G. grandoculis) is the largest species with a maximum published total length of 80 cm (31 in) while the rest of the species in the genus have maximum lengths between 35 and 45 cm (14 and 18 in).

== Distribution and habitat ==
Gymnocranius emperors are found in the Indo-West Pacific from the coast of eastern Africa and the Indian Ocean to the western and central Pacific Ocean. They are typically found in waters between 10 and 80 m (33 and 262 ft) deep over substrates of sand or rubble on continental coasts, although some species can be found off islands.

== Biology ==
Gymnocranius emperors are normally solitary, although one species G. griseus.. aggregates in schools. They are predators of benthic invertebrates.

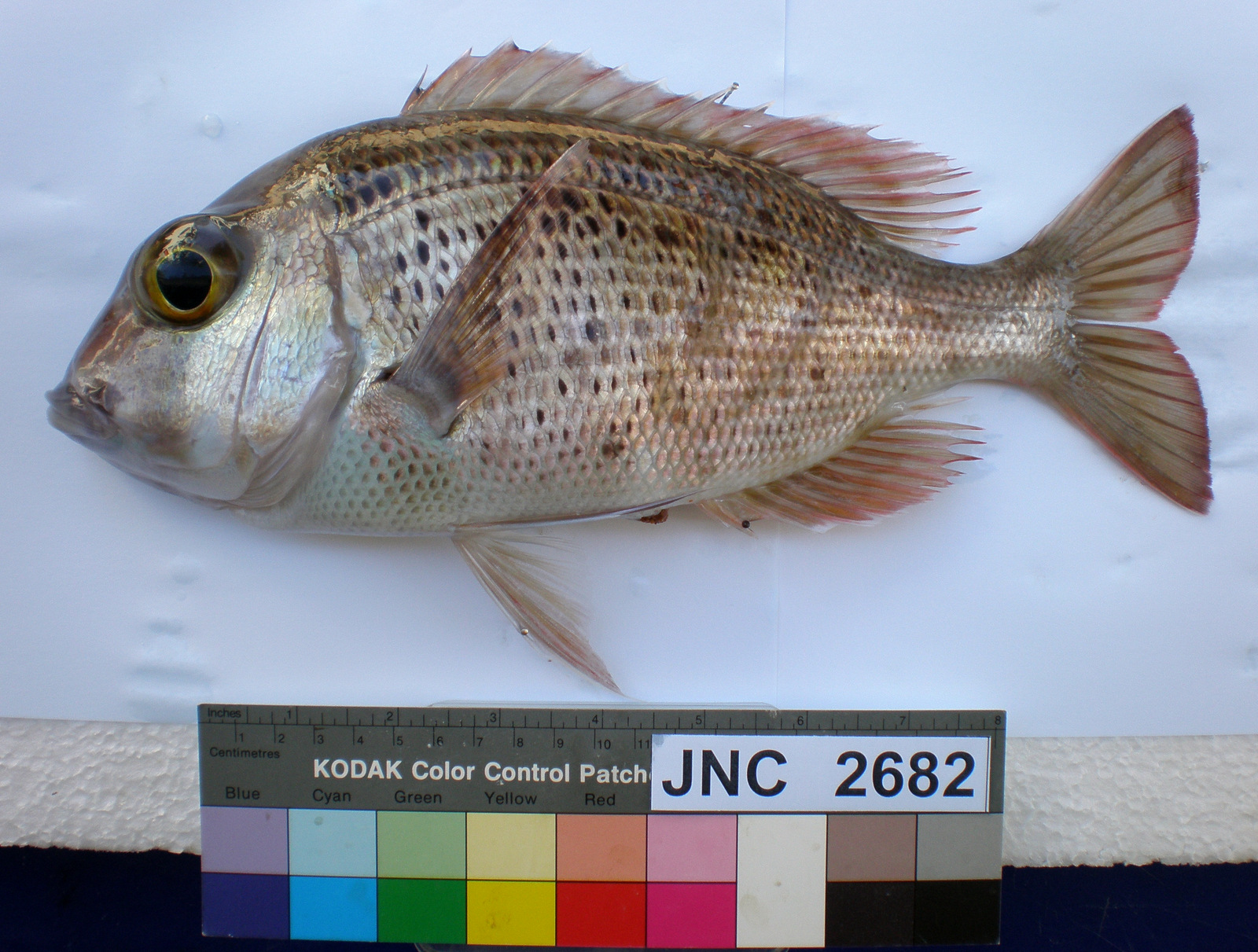
Gymnocranius euanus

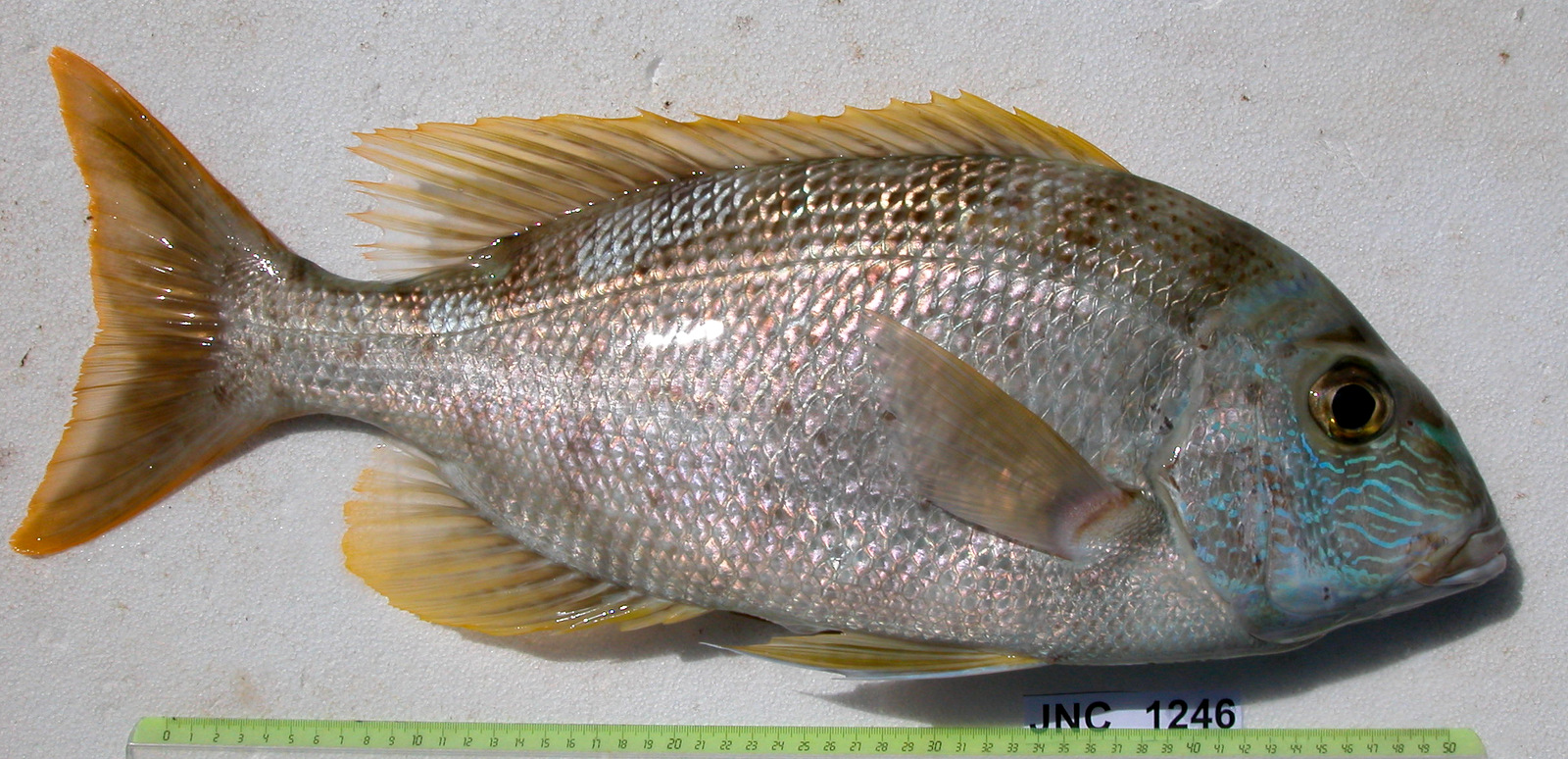
Gymnocranius grandoculis

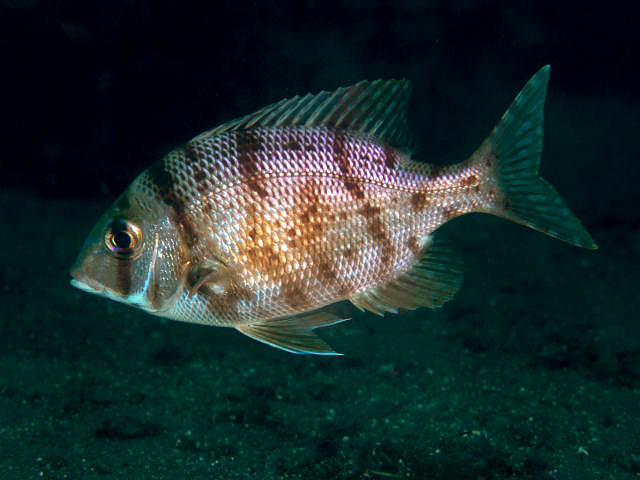
Gymnocranius griseus
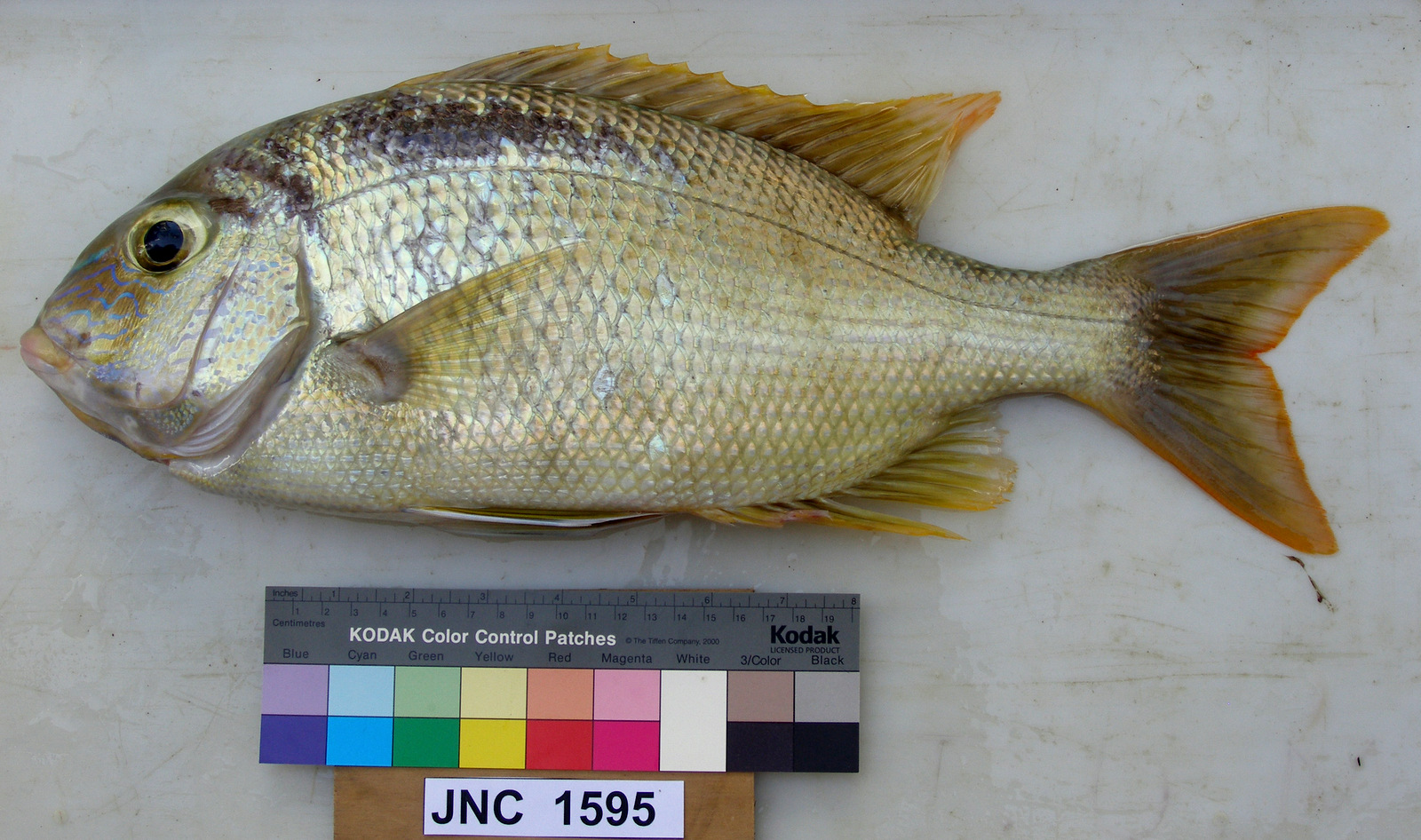
Gymnocranius grandoculis

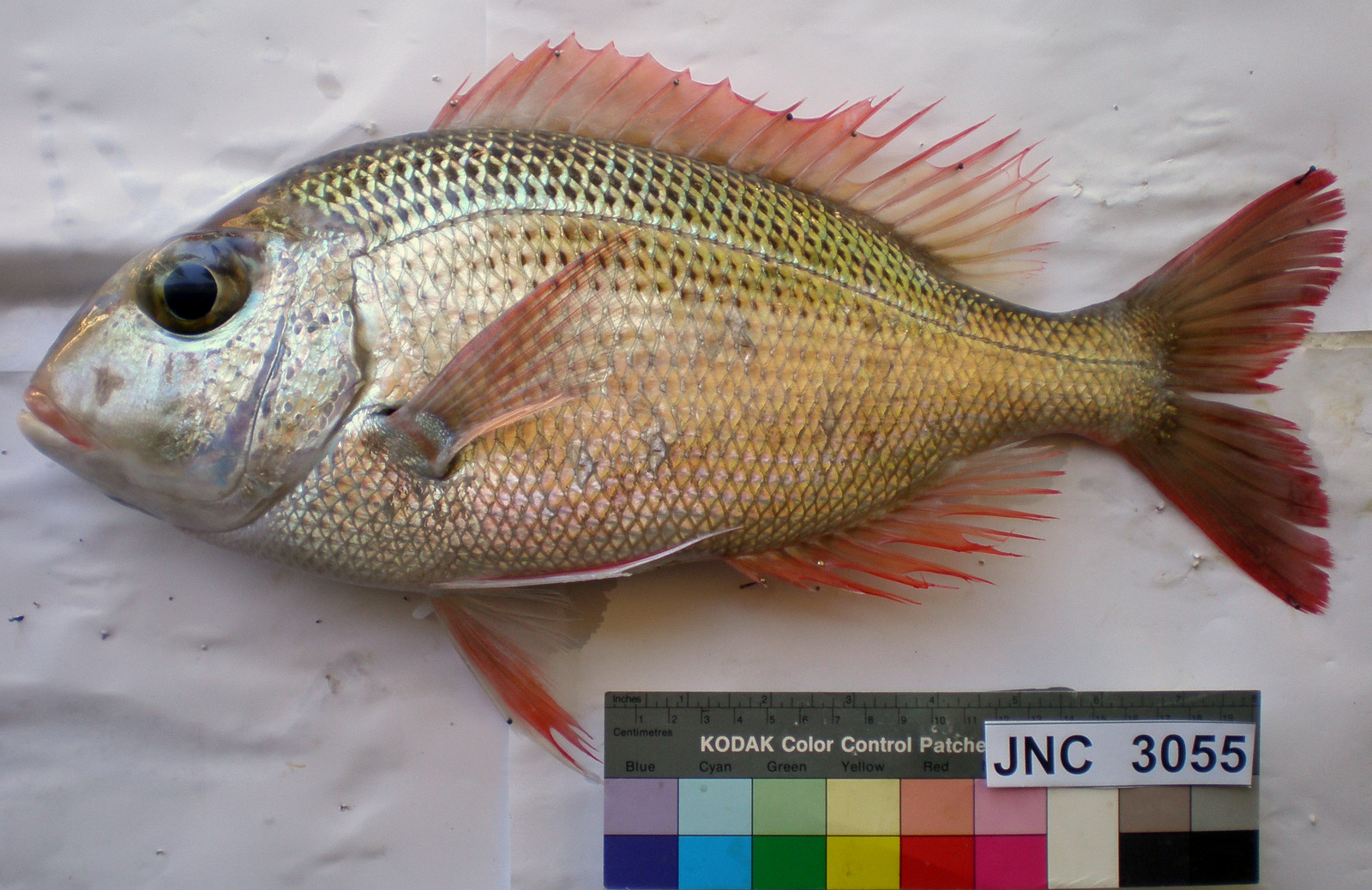
Gymnocranius satoi

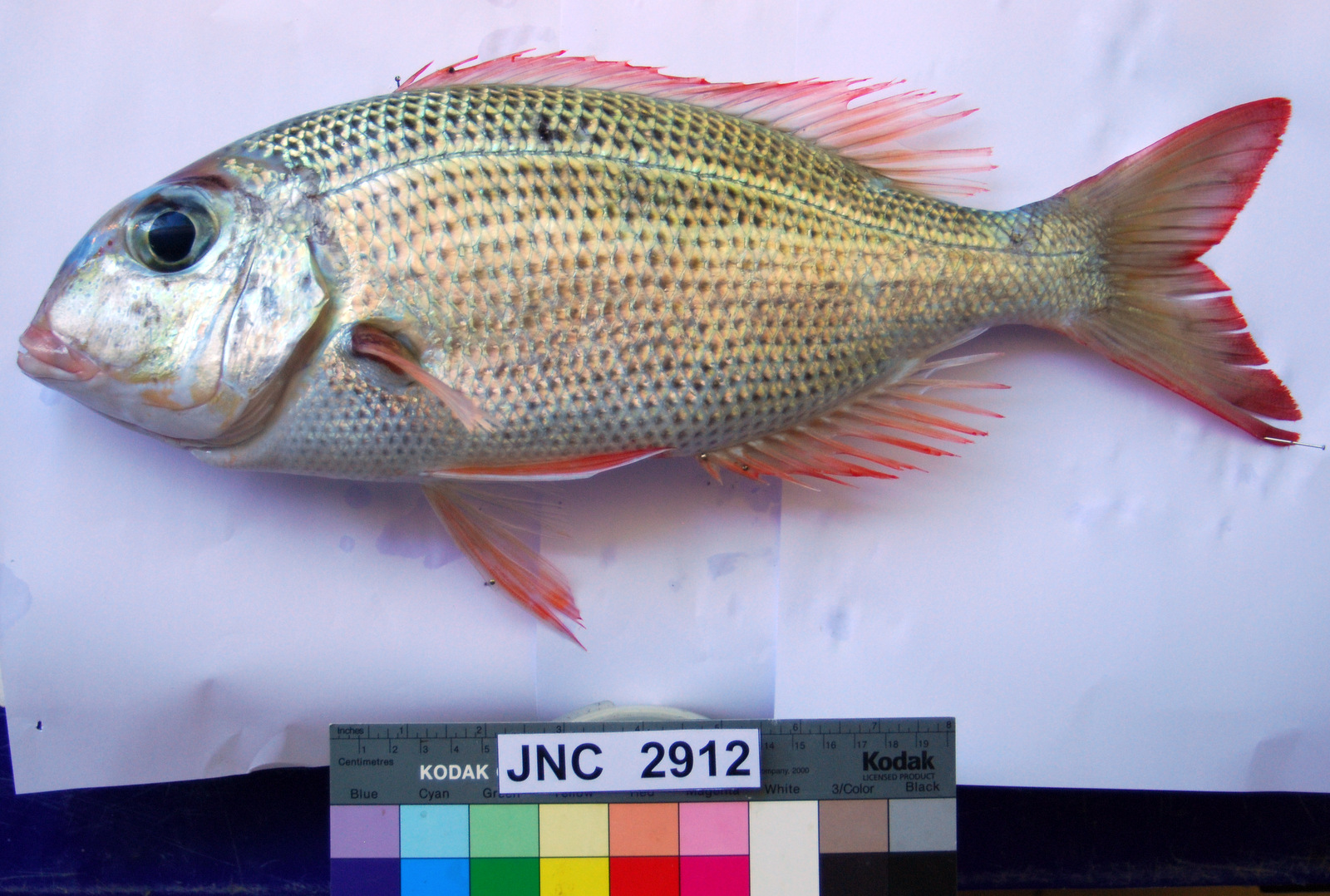
Gymnocranius superciliosus
