= Cristitectus =

Scientific classification
- Domain: Eukaryota
- Kingdom: Animalia
- Phylum: Nematoda
- Class: Chromadorea
- Order: Rhabditida
- Family: Cystidicolidae
- Genus: Cristitectus; Petter, 1970
- Species: C. congeri

Binomial name
- Cristitectus congeri Petter, 1970

Genus of worms

Cristitectus is a genus of parasitic nematodes, belonging to the family Cystidicolidae. Species of Cristitectus are parasitic as adults in the gastrointestinal tract of fish. According to the World Register of Marine Species, the genus currently (2019) includes a single species, Cristitectus congeri, which is a parasite of the European conger.

== Description ==
The genus Cristitectus is characterised by short cuticular ridges located on the anterior end. Cristitectus congeri was described from a single female, 24 mm in length.

== Etymology ==
The etymology is not detailed in the original publication but it can be inferred that the root "crist" in the name refers to the characteristic anterior cristae or ridges.

== Hosts and localities ==
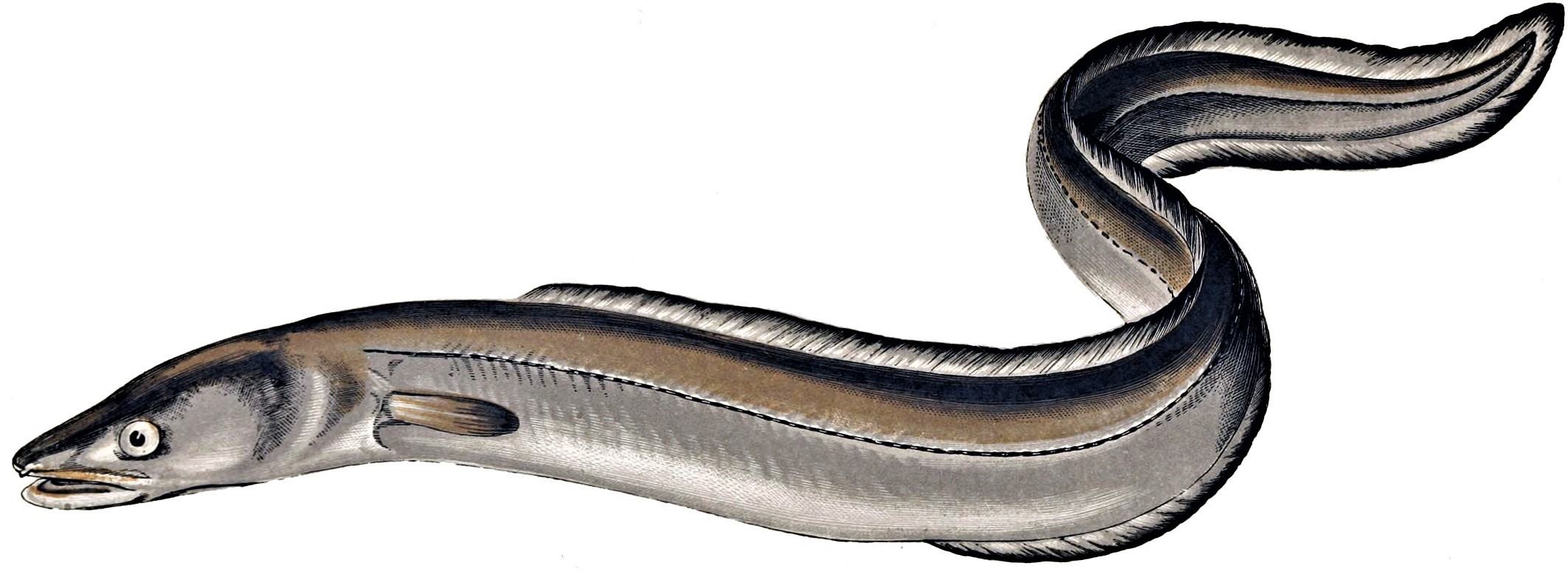
The European conger is the host of Cristitectus congeri

Cristitectus congeri Petter, 1970 is a parasite of the stomach of the European conger Conger conger. The type-locality is the Atlantic Ocean off Nantes in France.
