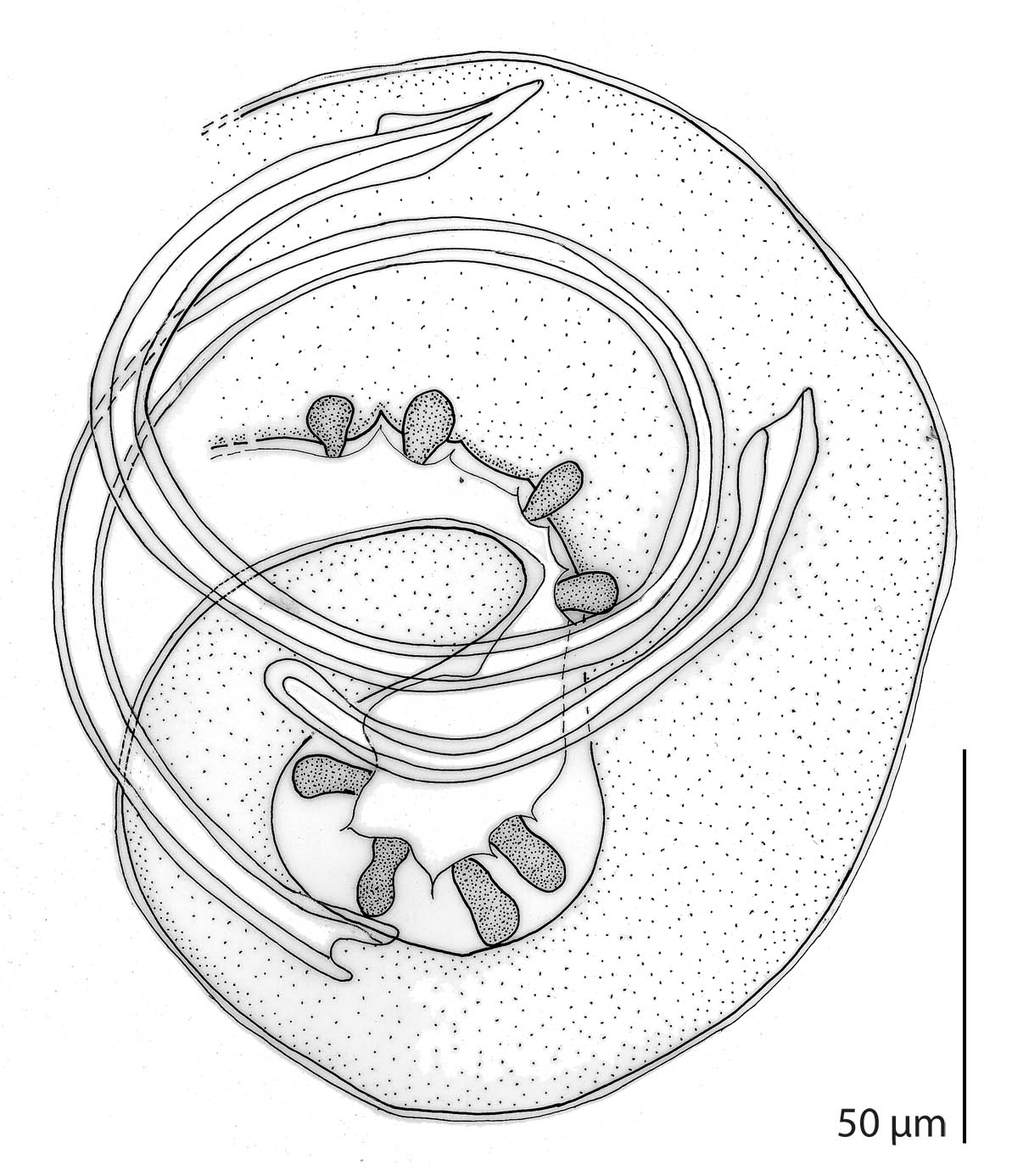
- Moravecnema segonzaci

Scientific classification
- Kingdom: Animalia
- Phylum: Nematoda
- Class: Chromadorea
- Order: Rhabditida
- Superfamily: Habronematoidea
- Family: Cystidicolidae; Skrjabin, 1946

Genera
- See text

= Cystidicolidae =

Family of roundworms

Cystidicolidae is a family of spirurian nematodes. It was described by Skrjabin in 1946. All members of the family are parasites of fish.

== Systematics ==
According to the World Register of Marine Species, the family Cystidicolidae includes the following genera:

- Ascarophis Van Beneden, 1871
- Ascarophisnema Moravec & Justine, 2010
- Caballeronema Margolis, 1977
- Capillospirura Skrjabin, 1924
- Collarinema Sey, 1970
- Comephoronema Layman, 1933
- Cristitectus Petter, 1970
- Ctenascarophis Mamaev, 1968
- Cystidicola Fisher, 1798
- Cystidicoloides Skinker, 1931
- Metabronema Yorke & Maplestone, 1926
- Metabronemoides Moravec & Justine, 2010
- Moravecnema Justine, Cassone & Petter, 2002
- Neoascarophis Machida, 1976
- Parascarophis Campana-Rouget, 1955
- Prospinitectus Petter, 1979
- Pseudascarophis Ko, Margolis & Machida, 1985
- Pseudoproleptus Khera, 1953
- Salmonema Moravec, Santos & Brasil-Sato, 2008
- Salvelinema Trofimenko, 1962
- Spinitectoides Petter, 1969
- Spinitectus Fourment, 1883
