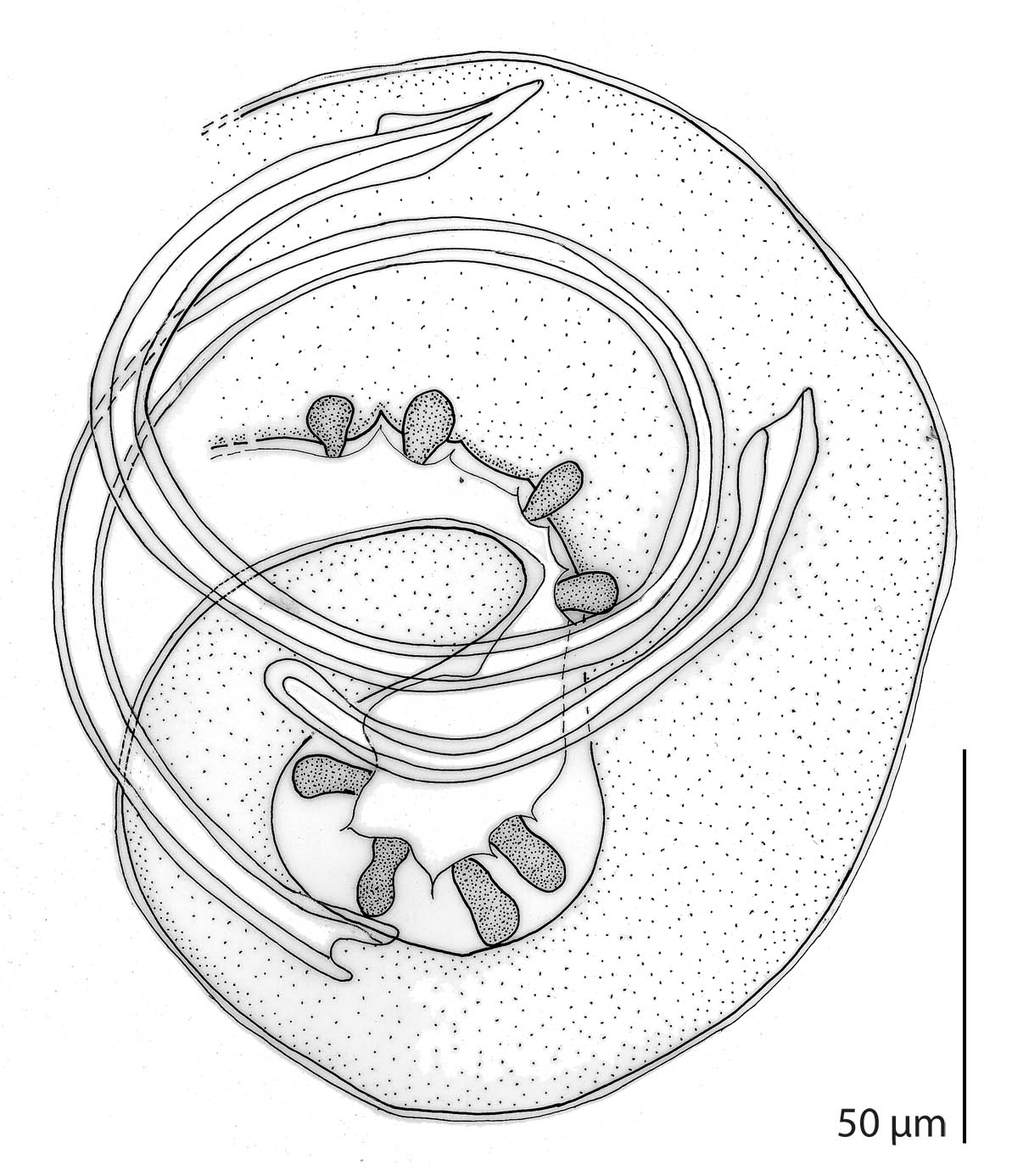
- Moravecnema segonzaci, male

Scientific classification
- Domain: Eukaryota
- Kingdom: Animalia
- Phylum: Nematoda
- Class: Chromadorea
- Order: Rhabditida
- Family: Cystidicolidae
- Genus: Moravecnema; Justine, Cassone & Petter, 2002
- Species: M. segonzaci

Binomial name
- Moravecnema segonzaci Justine, Cassone & Petter, 2002

= Moravecnema =

Genus of worms

Moravecnema is a genus of parasitic nematodes, belonging to the family Cystidicolidae. Species of Moravecnema are parasitic as adults in the gastrointestinal tract of fish. According to the World Register of Marine Species, the genus currently (2019) includes a single species, Moravecnema segonzaci, which is a parasite in a deep-sea fish.

== Description ==
The genus Moravecnema is characterised by a dorsoventrally elongated oral opening, rudimentary pseudolabia, and four pairs of precloacal and six pairs of postcloacal caudal papillae in the male.

== Etymology ==
The name of the genus Moravecnema was created in the honour of Czech parasitologist František Moravec, "in recognition to his outstanding work on systematics of fish nematodes". The gender is neuter. The specific epithet segonzaci refers to Michel Segonzac, from Ifremer, France, who collected the specimens.

== Hosts and localities ==
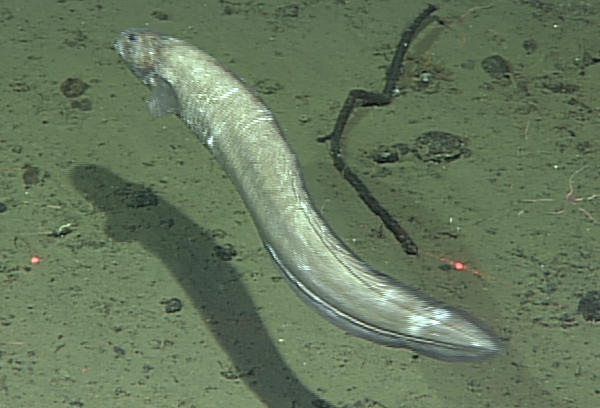
An undetermined specimen of the genus Pachychara photographed in deep-sea; a fish of this genus is the host of Moravecnema segonzaci

Moravecnema segonzaci Justine, Cassone & Petter, 2002 is a parasite of the intestine of the eelpout Pachycara thermophilum (Zoarcidae) from the hydrothermal sites Logatchev and Snake Pit-Moose of the Mid-Atlantic Ridge, at depths of 3,000-3,510 m. The fish were caught by slurp gun by the submarine DSV Alvin. The fish is a deep sea fish and this nematode is one of the few species recorded from deep-sea fish.
