= Metabronema =

Scientific classification
- Kingdom: Animalia
- Phylum: Nematoda
- Class: Chromadorea
- Order: Rhabditida
- Family: Cystidicolidae
- Genus: Metabronema; Yorke & Maplestone, 1926

Genus of nematodes

Metabronema is a genus of nematodes belonging to the family Cystidicolidae.

Species:

- Metabronema canadense
- Metabronema insulanum Solovjeva, 1991
- Metabronema magna Taylor, 1925
- Metabronema notopteri Karve & Naik, 1951
- Metabronema polymixia Kataitseva, 1979
- Metabronema salvelini Fujita, 1922
