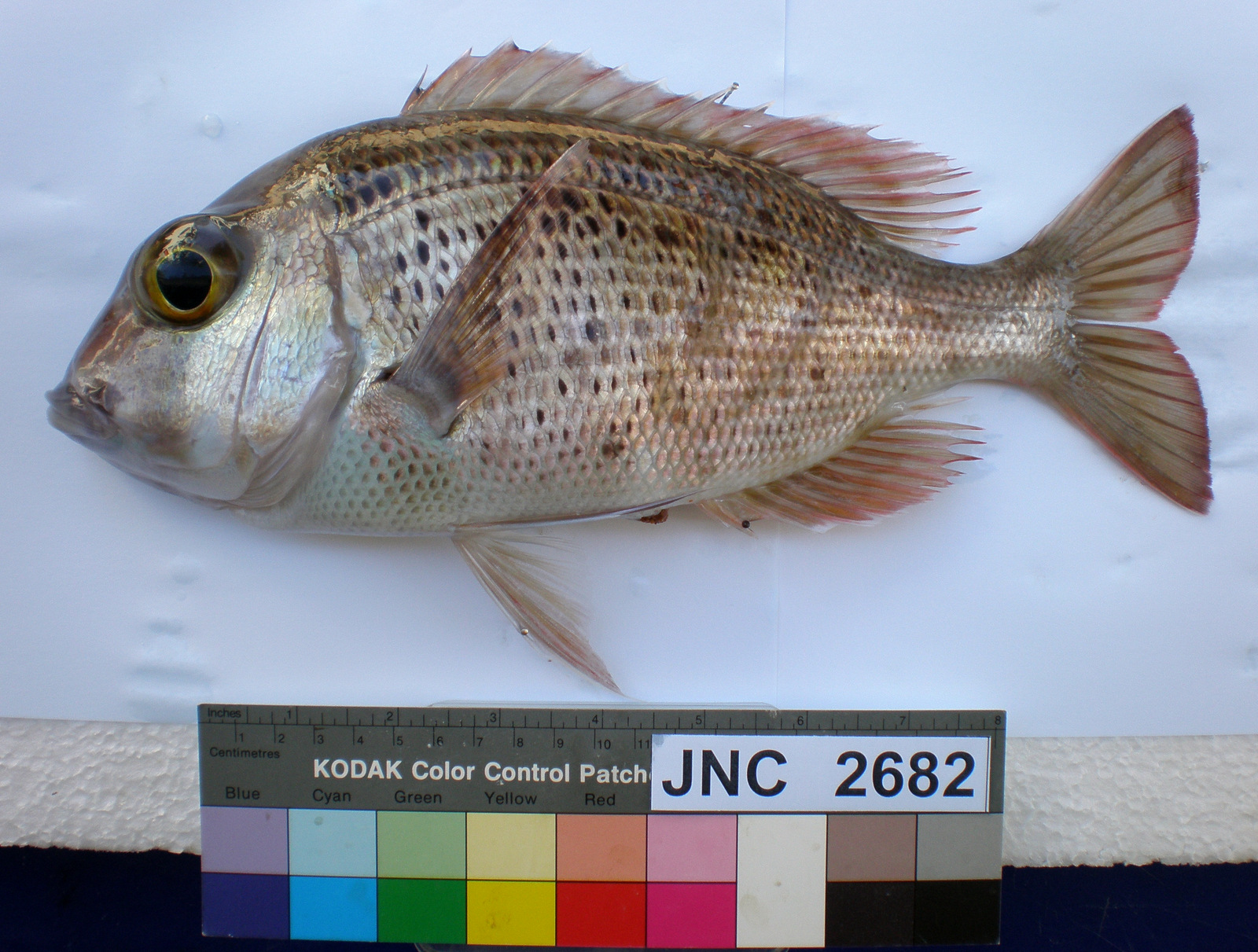

Conservation status
- Least Concern (IUCN 3.1)

Scientific classification
- Kingdom: Animalia
- Phylum: Chordata
- Class: Actinopterygii
- Order: Acanthuriformes
- Family: Lethrinidae
- Genus: Gymnocranius
- Species: G. euanus

Binomial name
- Gymnocranius euanus (Günther, 1879)

Synonyms
- Sphaerodon euanus Günther, 1879; Monotaxis affinis Whitley, 1943; Gymnocranius japonicus Akazaki, 1961

= Gymnocranius euanus =

Species of fish

Gymnocranius euanus, the Japanese large-eye bream, Japanese sea bream, paddletail bream, speckled emperor or iodine bream, is a species of marine ray-finned fish belonging to the family Lethrinidae, the emperors and emperor breams. This fish is found in the Western Pacific Ocean.

== Taxonomy ==
Gymnocranius euanus was first formally described as Sphaerodon euanus in 1879 by the German-born British ichthyologist Albert Günther with its type locality given as Eua in the Friendly Islands. Some authors place the genus Gymnocranius in the subfamily Monotaxinae but the 5th edition of Fishes of the World does not recognise the subfamilies traditionally accepted within the family Lethrinidae as valid. The family Lethrinidae is classified by the 5th edition of Fishes of the World as belonging to the order Spariformes.

== Etymology ==
Gymnocranius euanus has a specific name which suffixes -anus onto the type locality of 'Eua in modern Tonga.

== Description ==
Gymnocranius euanus has an oblong body that has a depth which fits into its standard length around two and a half times. The head has a deeply sloping dorsal profile. The eye is placed high on the head and is relatively large, although its diameter is a little less than the length of the snout. It has a relatively small mouth which has 2 or 3 pairs of small, thin canine-like teeth at the front of each jaw with most of the remaining teeth bristle-like but there are well developed molar-like teeth on the sides of the jaws. The dorsal fin is supported by 10 spines and 10 soft rays while the anal fin contains 3 spines and 10 soft rays. The caudal fin is moderately forked with blunt tipped lobes. The overall colour is silvery-grey to bluish grey marked with small black spots which are scattered on the body with pale pink fins. This species has a maximum published total length of 45 cm (18 in), although 35 cm (14 in) is more typical.

== Distribution and habitat ==
Gymnocranius euanus is found in the Western Pacific Ocean, where it ranges from the eastern Gulf of Thailand to New Caledonia and Tonga, northern to southern Japan, and south of Australia. In Australia, it is found from the northwest of Kalbarri, Western Australia, around the northern coast, to the Solitary Islands in New South Wales, the Coral Sea reefs, Lord Howe Island, and Norfolk Island. This species is found at depths between 15 and 50 m (49 and 164 ft) on substrates of sand and rubble next to rock and coral reefs in lagoons and on outer slopes.

== Biology ==
Gymnocranius euanus has adiet dominated by small bottom-dwelling gastropods. In Vanuatu these fishes have been recorded spawning in April and August.

== Fisheries ==
Gymnocranius euanus is a target for commercial fisheries in some areas where it is found being caught with long lines and hand lines.
