= Cystidicola =

Scientific classification
- Domain: Eukaryota
- Kingdom: Animalia
- Phylum: Nematoda
- Class: Chromadorea
- Order: Rhabditida
- Family: Cystidicolidae
- Genus: Cystidicola; Fischer, 1798

Genus of roundworms

Cystidicola is a genus of parasitic nematodes, belonging to the family Cystidicolidae. Species of Cystidicola are parasitic in the swimbladder of fish.

== Species ==
According to the World Register of Marine Species, the genus currently (2018) includes only the following species:

- Cystidicola farionis Fischer, 1798.

The eggs of Cystidicola farionis are covered with numerous filaments.

Other species have been included in the genus but are now considered to be part of other genera:

- Cystidicola marina Szidat, 1961
- Cystidicola salmonicola Ishii, 1916
- Cystidicola skrjabini Layman, 1933
- Cystidicola walkeri Ekbaum, 1935
