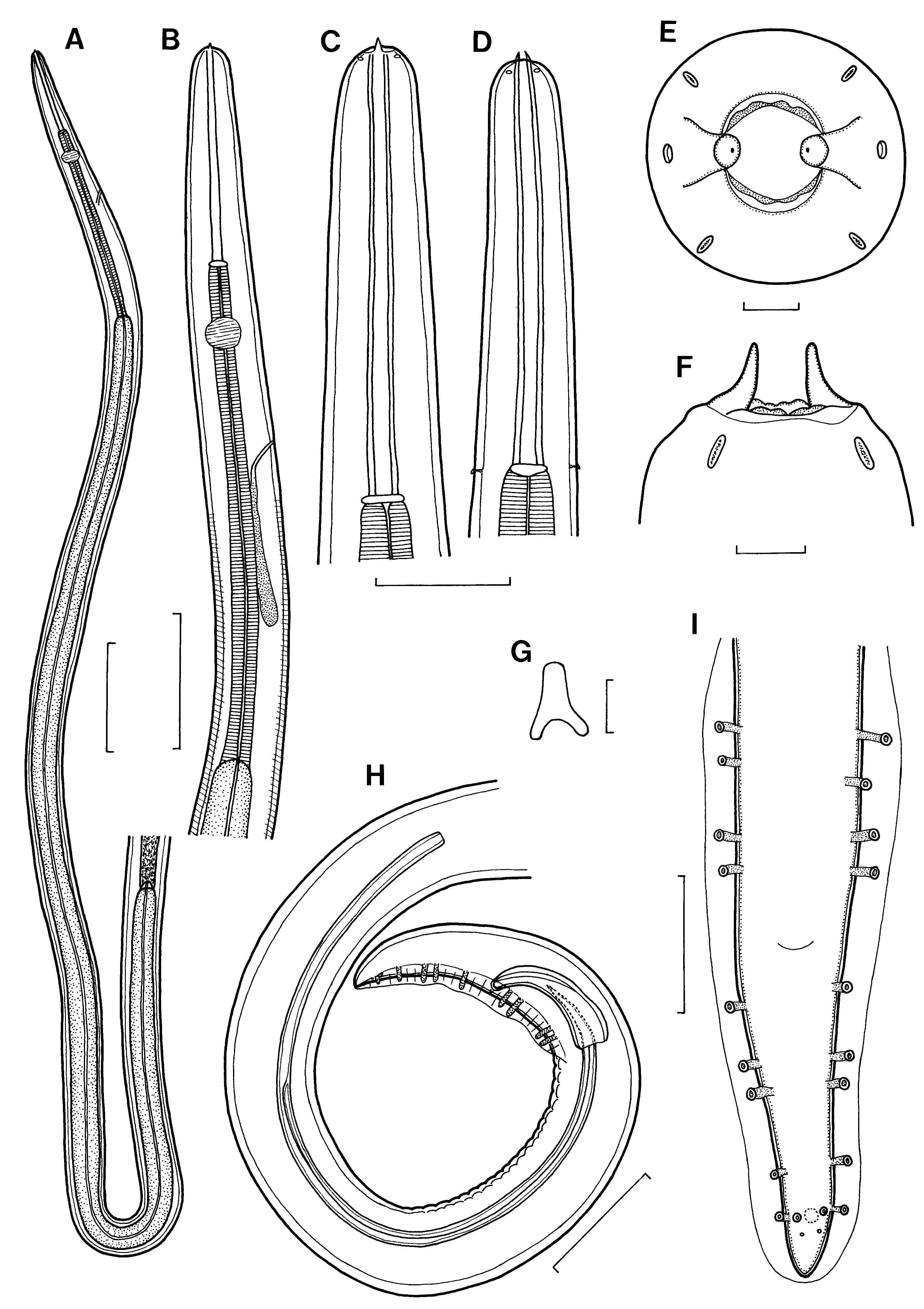
- Ascarophis (Similascarophis) richeri, male

Scientific classification
- Domain: Eukaryota
- Kingdom: Animalia
- Phylum: Nematoda
- Class: Chromadorea
- Order: Rhabditida
- Family: Cystidicolidae
- Genus: Ascarophis; Van Beneden, 1871

= Ascarophis =

Genus of worms

Ascarophis is a genus of parasitic nematodes, belonging to the family Cystidicolidae. Species of Ascarophis are parasitic as adults in the gastrointestinal tract of marine and estuarine fishes.

== Species ==
According to the World Register of Marine Species, the genus currently (2019) includes many species. A few are listed here:

- Ascarophis arctica Polyansky, 1952
- Ascarophis ayalai Caballero, 1975
- Ascarophis beryx Kataitseva, 1979
- Ascarophis brasiliensis Pinto, Vicente & Noronha, 1984
- Ascarophis capelanus Nikolaeva & Naidenova, 1964
- Ascarophis carvajali Muñoz & George-Nascimento, 2007
- Ascarophis cestus Chitwood, 1934
- Ascarophis cooperi Johnston & Mawson, 1945
- Ascarophis crassicollis Dollfus & Campana-Rouget, 1956
- Ascarophis distorta Fusco et Overstreet, 1978
- Ascarophis morrhuae Van Beneden, 1871 (Type-species) a parasite of the Atlantic cod Gadus morhua.

Several subgenera have been proposed, with the following species:

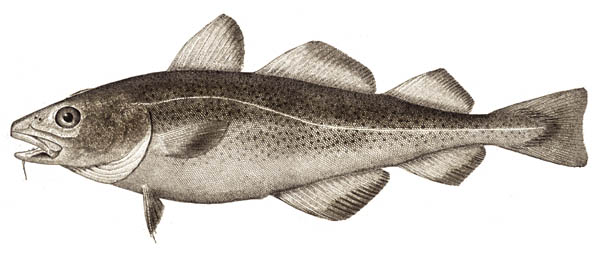
The Atlantic cod, Gadus morhua, is the host of Ascarophis morrhuae

- Subgenus Ascarophis (Dentiascarophis) Moravec & Justine, 2009
  - Ascarophis (Dentiascarophis) adioryx Machida, 1981
- Subgenus Ascarophis (Paraspinitectus) Moravec & Justine, 2009
  - Ascarophis (Paraspinitectus) beaveri Overstreet, 1970
- Subgenus Ascarophis (Similascarophis) Muñoz, González & George-Nascimento, 2004
  - Ascarophis (Similascarophis) chilensis (Muñoz, González & George-Nascimento, 2004) Moravec & González-Solís, 2007
  - Ascarophis (Similascarophis) marina (Szidat, 1961) Ivanov, Navone & Martorelli, 1997
  - Ascarophis (Similascarophis) maulensis (Muñoz, González & George-Nascimento, 2004) Moravec & González-Solís, 2007
  - Ascarophis (Similascarophis) nasonis Machida, 1981
  - Ascarophis (Similascarophis) richeri Moravec & Justine, 2007
