= Spinitectus =

Scientific classification
- Kingdom: Animalia
- Phylum: Nematoda
- Class: Chromadorea
- Order: Rhabditida
- Family: Cystidicolidae
- Genus: Spinitectus; Fourment, 1883

Genus of roundworms

Spinitectus is a genus of nematodes belonging to the family Cystidicolidae.

The genus has almost cosmopolitan distribution.

Species:

- Spinitectus acipenseri Choudhury & Dick, 1992
- Spinitectus agonostomi Moravec & Barus, 1971
- Spinitectus aguapeiensis Acosta, González-Solís & Da Silva, 2017
- Spinitectus aguapeiensis Moravec & Baruš, 1971
- Spinitectus anguillae Moravec, Nagasawa & Hatama, 2020
- Spinitectus asperus Travassos, Artigas & Pereira, 1928
- Spinitectus carolini Holl, 1928
- Spinitectus cristatus Railliet & Henry, 1915
- Spinitectus echenei Parukhin, 1967
- Spinitectus gabata Poinar, Weinstein, Garcia-Vedrenne & Kuris, 2014
- Spinitectus gigi Fujita, 1927
- Spinitectus gordoni Cordero del Campillo & Alvarez-Pellitero, 1976
- Spinitectus gracilis Ward & Magath, 1917
- Spinitectus guntheri Baylis, 1929
- Spinitectus inermis (Zeder, 1800)
- Spinitectus jamundensis Thatcher & Padilha, 1977
- Spinitectus macrospinosus Choudhury & Perryman, 2003
- Spinitectus mirabilis Moravec & Nagasawa, 2020
- Spinitectus notopteri Karve & Naik, 1951
- Spinitectus oviflagellis Fourment, 1883
- Spinitectus palmyraensis Fourment, 1883
- Spinitectus palmyraensis González-Solís & Vidal-Martínez, 2019
- Spinitectus polli Campana-Rouget, 1961
- Spinitectus tamari Naidenova, 1966
