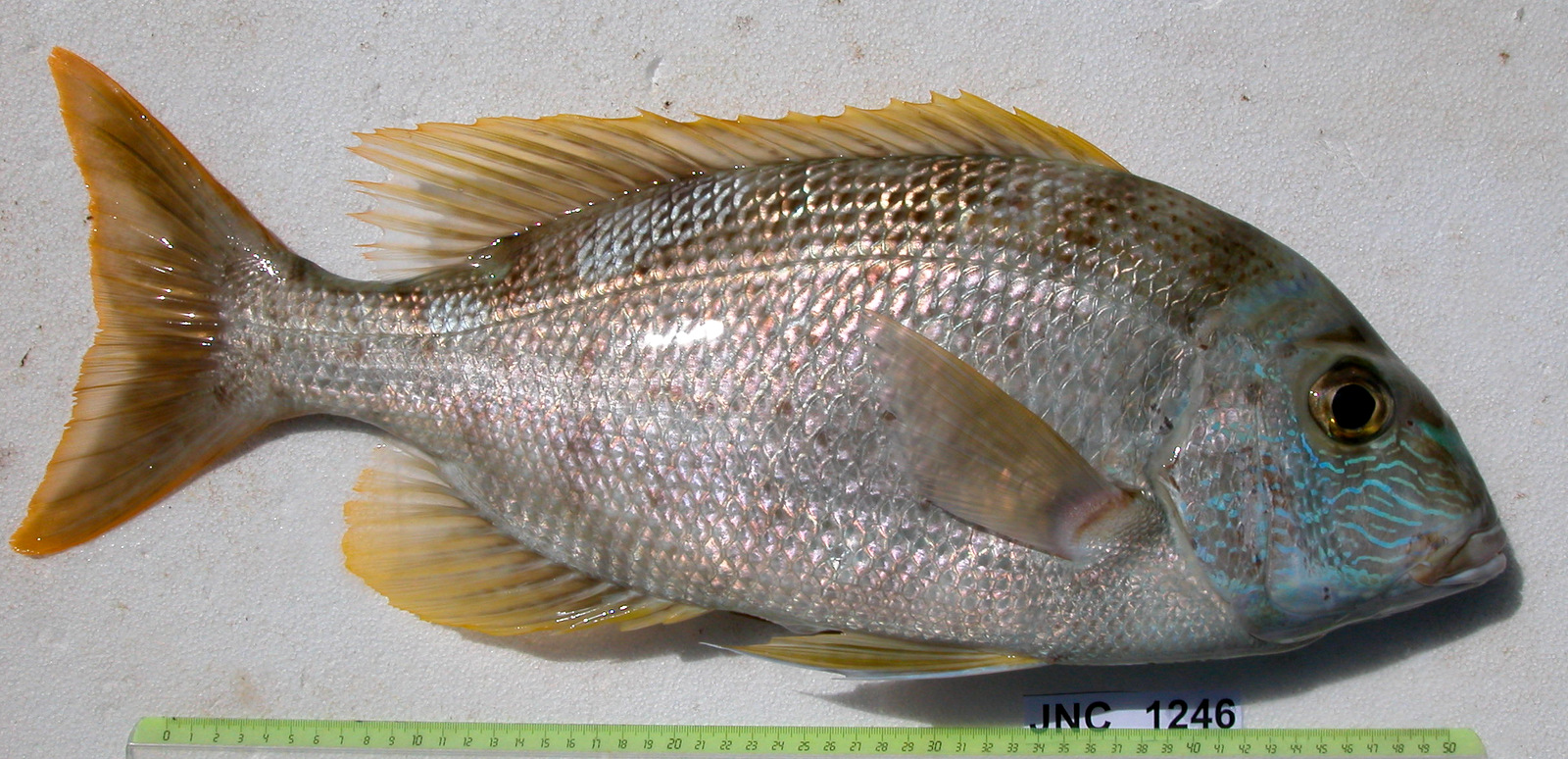

Conservation status
- Least Concern (IUCN 3.1)

Scientific classification
- Kingdom: Animalia
- Phylum: Chordata
- Class: Actinopterygii
- Order: Acanthuriformes
- Family: Lethrinidae
- Genus: Gymnocranius
- Species: G. grandoculis

Binomial name
- Gymnocranius grandoculis (Valenciennes, 1830)

Synonyms
- Cantharus grandoculis Valenciennes, 1830; Dentex rivulatus Rüppell, 1838; Gymnocranius rivulatus (Rüppell, 1838); Dentex lethrinoides Bleeker, 1850; Gymnocranius lethrinoides (Bleeker, 1850); Pentapus dux Valenciennes, 1862; Pentapus curtus Guichenot, 1863; Dentex robinsoni Gilchrist & Thompson, 1909; Gymnocranius robinsoni (Gilchrist & Thompson, 1909); Paradentex marshalli Whitley, 1936; Gymnocranius ruppellii J. L. B. Smith, 1941

= Gymnocranius grandoculis =

Species of fish

Gymnocranius grandoculis, the blue-lined large-eye bream, iodine bream, Maori sea bream or Robinson's sea bream, is a species of marine ray-finned fish belonging to the family Lethrinidae, the emperors and emperor breams. This fish has a wide Indo-Pacific distribution.

== Taxonomy ==
Gymnocranius grandoculis was first formally described as Cantharus grandoculis in 1830 by the French zoologist Achille Valenciennes with its type locality given as the Seychelles. In 1870 Carl Benjamin Klunzinger proposed a new subgenus of Dentex, Gymnocranius, with Dentex rivulatus, a species described in 1838 by Eduard Rüppell from Jeddah, as its only species. Rüppell's D. rivulatus is now treated as a synonym of G. grandoculis and is the type species of the genus Gymnocranius. Some authors place this genus in the subfamily Monotaxinae but the 5th edition of Fishes of the World does not recognise the subfamilies traditionally accepted within the family Lethrinidae as valid. The family Lethrinidae is classified by the 5th edition of Fishes of the World as belonging to the order Spariformes.

== Etymology ==
Gymnocranius grandoculis has a specific name, grandoculis, which means "big-eyed", referring to the large eyes of this species, and genus.

== Description ==
Gymnocranius grandoculis has an oblong body that has a depth which fits into its standard length around two and a half times. The head has a moderately sloping dorsal profile with the larger adults having a bony ridge on the nape and a bony shelf oabove the anterior part of the eye. The eye is placed high on the head and is relatively large, although its diameter is a little less than the length of the snout. The continuous dorsal fin is supported by 10 spines and 10 soft rays while the anal fin contains 2 spines and 10 soft rays. The teeth in the jaws are conical at the front and are bristle-like to conical at the sides. The caudal fin is moderately fork with pointed lobes. The overall colour is golden brown to yellowish with wavy blue lines and spots on the head in front of the eye, the cheek and the operculum. The fins are yellowish-orange and the caudal fin has an orange margin. They frequently show dark diagonal bars on the body. This species has a maximum published total length of 80 cm (31 in), although 64 cm (25 in) is more typical, and the maximum published weight is 5.5 kg (12 lb).

== Distribution and habitat ==
Gymnocranius grandoculis has a wide distribution in the Indian and Pacific Oceans. It occurs from the Red Sea south to South Africa across the Indian Ocean, although it is absent from the Persian Gulf into the Pacific Ocean where it occurs north to Japan and east to the Tuamotus and south to Australia. In Australia it occurs at least as far south as Yanchep in Western Australia along the northern coasts to Townsville in Queensland, as well as the Cocos (Keeling) Islands and the Ashmore and Cartier Reefs in the Timor Sea. This species is found on soft mud or sand substrates, also on rock substrates in offshore waters at depths of 50 to 100 m (160 to 330 ft).

== Biology ==
Gymnocranius grandoculis occurs a solitary individuals or in small schools. It feeds mainly on bethic invertebrates and smaller fishers.

== Fisheries ==
Gymnocranius grandoculis is a target for artisanal fishers in many parts of its range, much of the catch is caught with bottom longlines and bottom trawls. It is used as bait in tuna fisheries in the Philippines and is taken as bycatch on the Great Barrier Reef.
