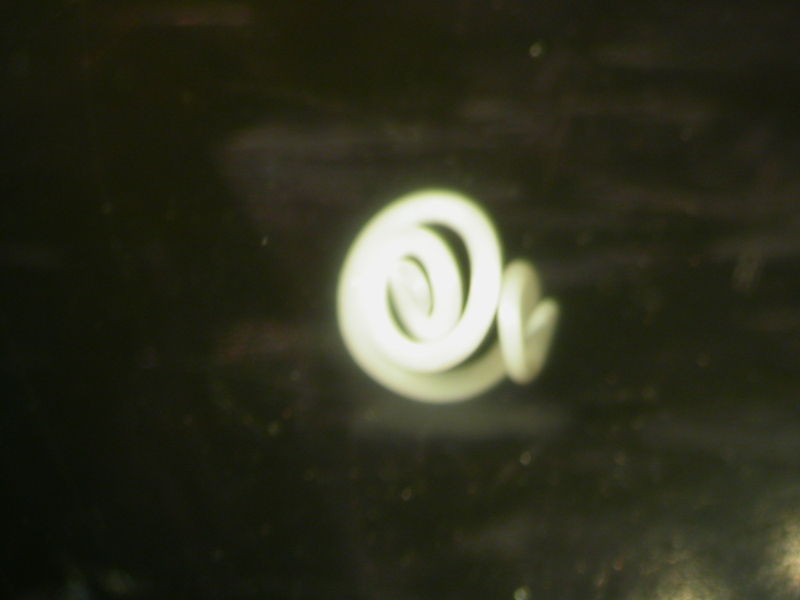
- Anisakis simplex larva

Scientific classification
- Kingdom: Animalia
- Phylum: Nematoda
- Class: Chromadorea
- Order: Rhabditida
- Superfamily: Ascaridoidea
- Family: Anisakidae; Scriabine & Karokhin, 1945

Genera
- See text

= Anisakidae =

Family of roundworms

The Anisakidae are a family of intestinal nematodes (roundworms). The larvae of these worms can cause anisakiasis when ingested by humans, in raw or insufficiently cooked fish.

Anisakidae worms can infect many species of fish, birds, mammals and even reptiles.

They have some traits that are common with other parasites. These include: spicules, tail shapes and caudal papillae.

This family of parasites have a complex life cycle, meaning that they come in contact with more than one host throughout the duration of their life. Adult Anisakidae worms lay eggs in the gut of many species of marine mammals, and then these eggs are excreted from the host via fecal matter. Once these hatched larvae are in open water, they can be ingested by krill or other crustaceans. At this stage, the prevalence, or proportion of infected hosts, is rather low. The infected crustaceans can then be eaten by fish and cephalopods, where the parasite then furthers its development. Once the fish obtains the parasite, it then can reach the definitive host, or final host, through the consumption of the infected fish.

The prevalence of this parasite in humans is higher in places that regularly consume raw fish, such as Japan, France, Spain, and other European countries. There have been reported incidents of this parasites worldwide, but not as prevalent as the above-mentioned countries.

== List of genera ==
List of genera according to the World Register of Marine Species:

- Acanthocheilus Molin, 1858
- Anisakis Dujardin, 1845
- Brevimulticaecum Mozgovoi, 1951
- Contracaecum Railliet & Henry, 1912
- Euterranova Moravec & Justine, 2020
- Goezia Zeder, 1800
- Neoterranova Moravec & Justine, 2020
- Phocanema Myers, 1959
- Phocascaris Höst, 1932
- Pseudoterranova Mozgovoi, 1951
- Terranova Leiper & Atkinson, 1914Taxon inquirendum
