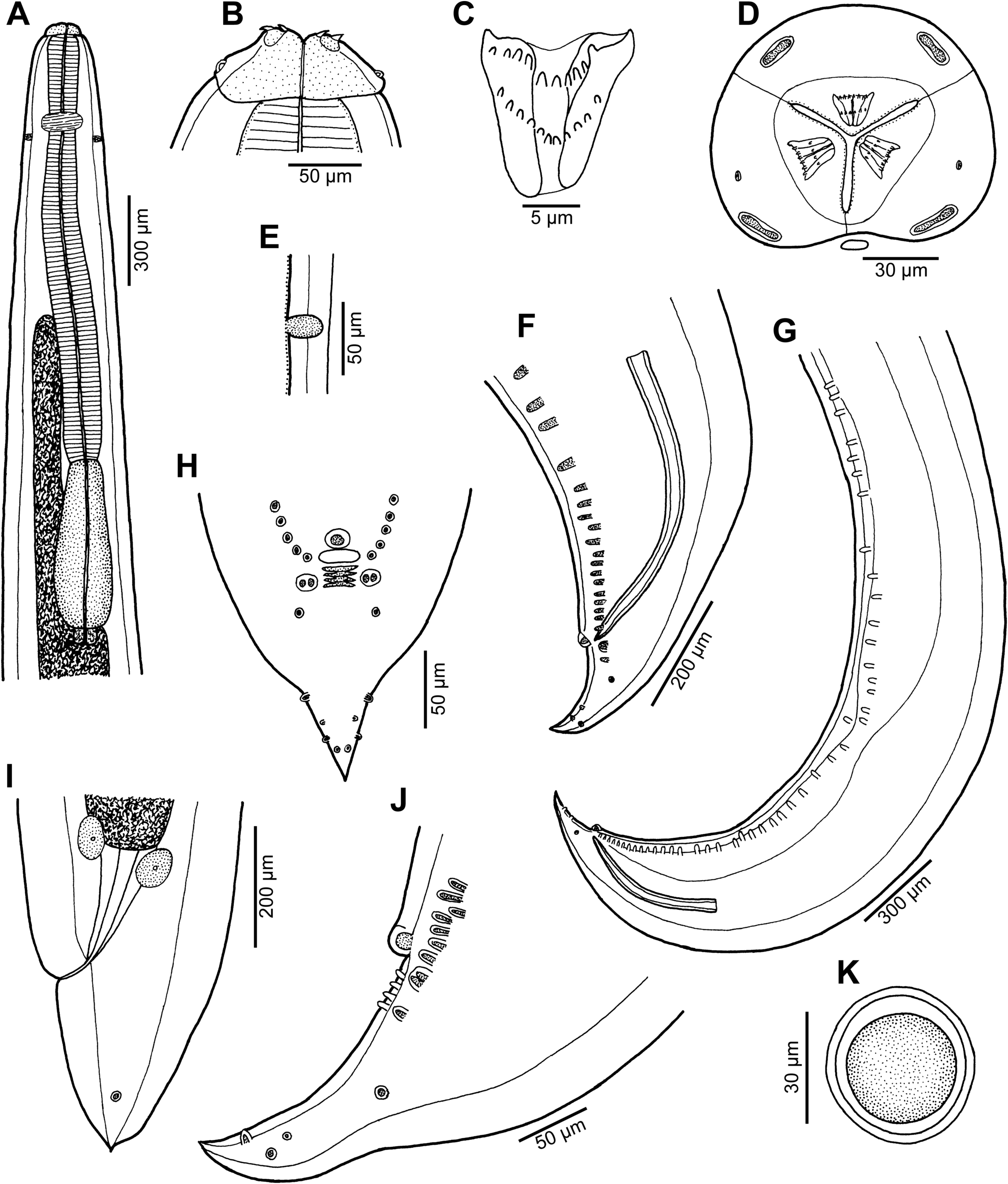
- Euterranova dentiduplicata

Scientific classification
- Kingdom: Animalia
- Phylum: Nematoda
- Class: Chromadorea
- Order: Rhabditida
- Family: Anisakidae
- Genus: Euterranova; Moravec & Justine, 2020

Species
- E. dentiduplicata Moravec & Justine, 2020 (Type species); E. galeocerdonis (Thwaite, 1927) Moravec & Justine, 2020; E. ginglymostomae (Olsen, 1952) Moravec & Justine, 2020; E. pectinolabiata (Shamsi, Barton & Zhu, 2019) Moravec & Justine, 2020; E. pristis (Baylis & Daubney, 1922) Moravec & Justine, 2020

= Euterranova =

Genus of parasitic nematodes

Euterranova is a genus of parasitic nematodes that have life cycles involving elasmobranchs. The genus was created in 2020 to accommodate species which were previously included inTerranova Leiper & Atkinson, 1914 a taxon considered to be invalid.

== Etymology ==
The name Euterranova is composed of Terranova (the name of a nematode genus) and the prefix Eu- (= proper, true). The gender is feminine.

== Species ==
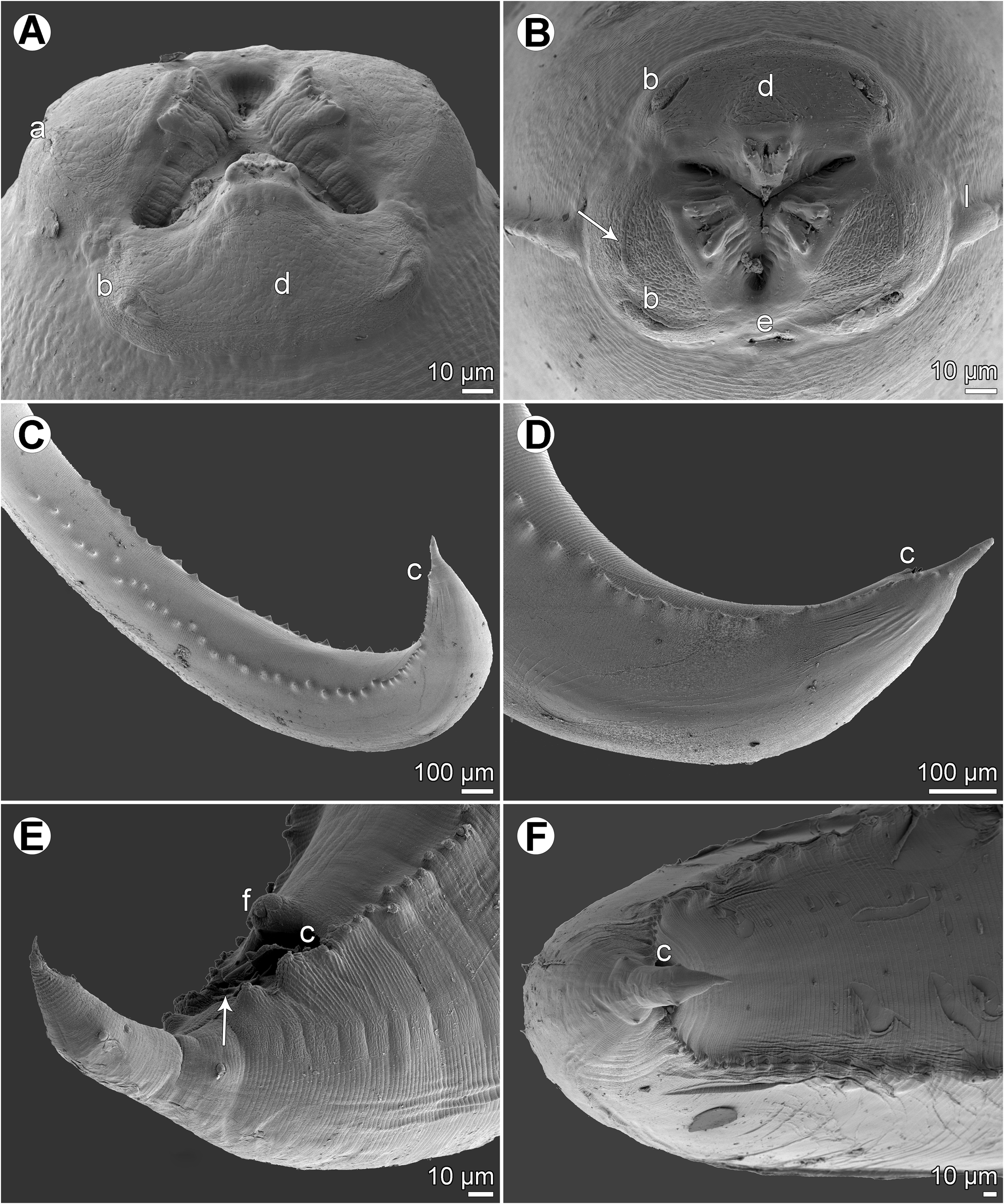
Scanning electron microscope images of Euterranova dentiduplicata

The type-species is E. dentiduplicata Moravec & Justine, 2020. It was described in 2020 from specimens from the stomach of the Zebra shark Stegostoma fasciatum, collected from off New Caledonia.

Other species are listed in the taxobox. All are parasites of elasmobranchs. An undescribed species (Euterranova sp.) was also recorded from the shark Triaenodon obesus off New Caledonia.

== See also ==
Neoterranova
