= Terranova (nematode) =

Scientific classification
- Kingdom: Animalia
- Phylum: Nematoda
- Class: Chromadorea
- Order: Rhabditida
- Family: Anisakidae
- Genus: Terranova; Leiper & Atkinson, 1914

Species
- The following are classified as within Euterranova by Moravec and Justine: T. galeocerdonis Thwaite, 1927; T. pectinolabiata Shamsi, Barton & Zhu, 2019; T. pristis Baylis & Daubney, 1922; The following is classified as within Neoterranova by Moravec and Justine: T. scoliodontis Baylis, 1931; The following are not reclassified in either newly erected genus by Moravec and Justine: T. amoyensis Fang & Luo, 2006; T. antarctica Leiper & Atkinson, 1914; T. brevicapitata Linton, 1901; T. edcaballeroi Díaz-Ungría, 1970; T. aetoplatea Luo, 2001; T. circularis Linstow, 1907; T. nidifex Linton, 1901; T. trichiuri Chandler, 1935

Genus of roundworms

Terranova is a genus of parasitic nematodes. Species from this genus are known to parasitise sharks, rays, sawfishes, teleosts and crocodilians.

However, in 2020, František Moravec and Jean-Lou Justine considered this taxon to be invalid on the ground that "its type species [i. e., T. antarctica] has been designated a species inquirenda", and split many of its species into two new-described genera, Euterranova and Neoterranova. The type specimen and so far only found adult individual available for feature classification of T. antarctica is a female, and many features for such parasites are better discernible among males. Thus, in an article from 1990, the place of T. antarctica was considered as doubtful. Moravec and Justine argued that if the type species is doubtful, then by definition so is the entire genus, in this case, the genus Terranova. However, their reclassification was based entirely on analysis of morphological features, and they recognised that molecular analysis again may lead to a changed taxonomy.
