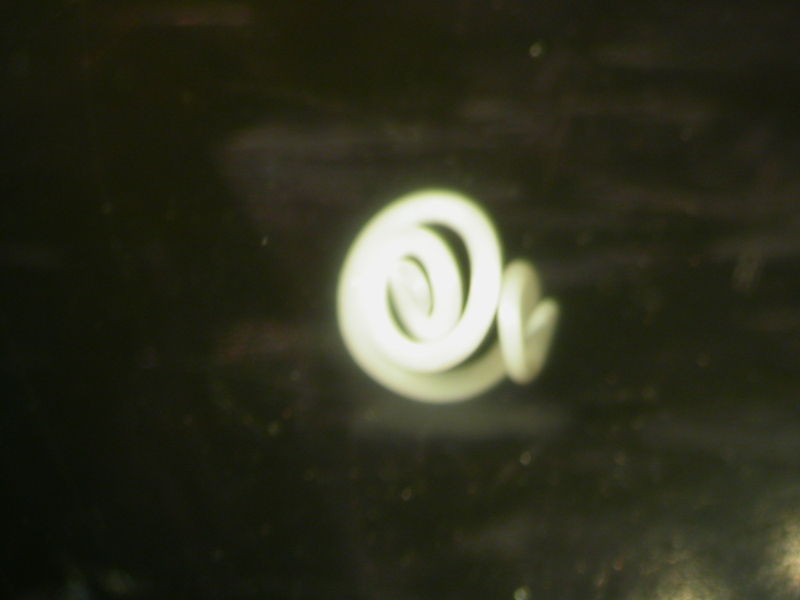
- Anisakis simplex

Scientific classification
- Kingdom: Animalia
- Phylum: Nematoda
- Class: Chromadorea
- Order: Rhabditida
- Family: Anisakidae
- Genus: Anisakis; Dujardin, 1845

Species
- A. berlandi; A. brevispiculata; A. nascettii; A. oceanica; A. paggiae; A. pegreffii; A. physeteris; A. schupakovi; A. similis; A. simplex; A. typica; A. ziphidarum

= Anisakis =

Genus of parasitic nematodes

Anisakis (/ænəˈsɑːkiːz/ a-nə-SAH-keez) is a genus of parasitic nematodes that have life cycles involving fish and marine mammals. They are infective to humans and cause anisakiasis. People who produce immunoglobulin E in response to this parasite may subsequently have an allergic reaction, including anaphylaxis, after eating fish infected with Anisakis species.

== Etymology ==
The genus Anisakis was defined in 1845 by Félix Dujardin as a subgenus of the genus Ascaris Linnaeus, 1758. Dujardin did not make explicit the etymology, but stated that the subgenus included the species in which the males have unequal spicules ("mâles ayant des spicules inégaux"); thus, the name Anisakis is based on anis- (Greek prefix for unequal) and akis (Greek for spine or spicule). Two species were included in the new subgenus, Ascaris (Anisakis) distans Rudolphi, 1809 and Ascaris (Anisakis) simplex Rudolphi, 1809.

== Life cycle ==
Complex life cycle of Anisakis worms

Anisakis species have complex life cycles which pass through several hosts through the course of their lives. Eggs hatch in seawater, and larvae are eaten by crustaceans, usually euphausids. The infected crustaceans are subsequently eaten by fish or squid, and the nematodes burrow into the wall of the gut and encyst in a protective coat, usually on the outside of the visceral organs, but occasionally in the muscle or beneath the skin. The life cycle is completed when an infected fish is eaten by a marine mammal, such as a whale, seal, sea lion, dolphin or another animal like a seabird or shark.The nematode excysts in the intestine, feeds, grows, mates, and releases eggs into the seawater in the host's feces. As the gut of a marine mammal is functionally very similar to that of a human, Anisakis species can infect humans who eat raw or undercooked fish.

=== Reproduction ===
Sexual reproduction occurs once the larvae have reached a definitive host and completed their final molt, at which point sexual organs are developed. Females are capable of producing 2.6 million eggs, depending on species and size at sexual maturity.

The known diversity of the genus has increased greatly since mid-1980s with the advent of modern genetic techniques in species identification. Each final host species was discovered to have its own biochemically and genetically identifiable "sibling species" of Anisakis, which is reproductively isolated. This finding has allowed the proportion of different sibling species in a fish to be used as an indicator of population identity in fish stocks.

== Morphology ==
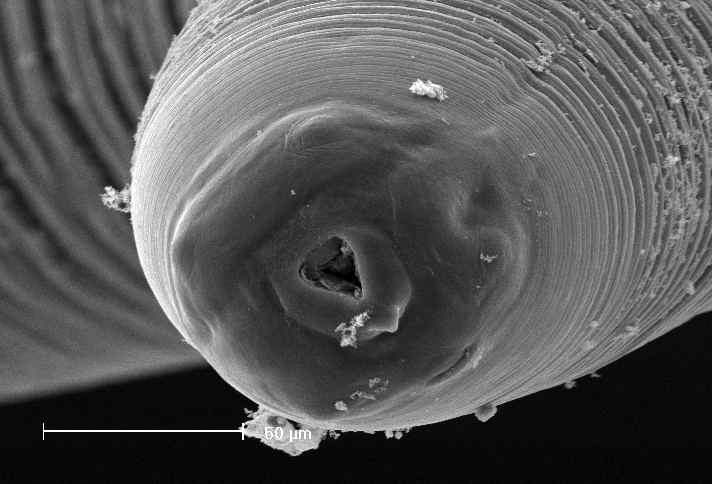
A scanning electron micrograph of the mouthparts of A. simplex

Anisakis share the common features of all nematodes: the vermiform body plan, round in cross section, and a lack of segmentation. The body cavity is reduced to a narrow pseudocoel. The mouth is located anteriorly and surrounded by projections used in feeding and sensation, with the anus slightly offset from the posterior. The squamous epithelium secretes a layered cuticle to protect the body from digestive acids.

As with all parasites with a complex life cycle involving several hosts, details of the morphology vary depending on the host and life cycle stage. In the stage that infects fish, Anisakis species are found in a distinctive "watch-spring coil" shape. They are roughly two centimeters long when uncoiled. When in the final host, anisakids are longer, thicker, and more sturdy, to deal with the hazardous environment of a mammalian gut.

== Health implications ==
Anisakids pose a risk to human health through intestinal infection with worms from the eating of underprocessed fish and through allergic reactions to chemicals left by the worms in fish flesh.

=== Anisakiasis ===
Anisakiasis
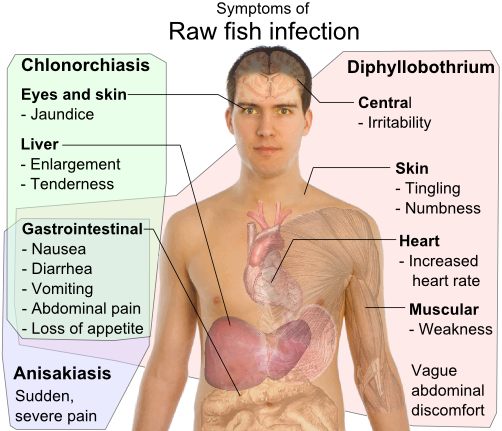
- Differential symptoms of parasite infection by raw fish: Clonorchis sinensis (trematode/fluke), Anisakis (nematode/roundworm) and Diphyllobothrium (cestode/tapeworm), all have gastrointestinal, but otherwise distinct, symptoms.
- Specialty: Infectious disease

Anisakiasis is a human parasitic infection of the gastrointestinal tract caused by the consumption of raw or undercooked seafood containing larvae of the nematode Anisakis simplex.

Within a few hours of ingestion, the parasitic worm tries to burrow through the intestinal wall, but since it cannot penetrate it, it gets stuck and dies. The presence of the parasite triggers an immune response; immune cells surround the worms, forming a ball-like structure that can block the digestive system, causing severe abdominal pain, malnutrition, and vomiting. Occasionally, the larvae are regurgitated. If the larvae pass into the bowel or large intestine, a severe eosinophilic granulomatous response may also occur one to two weeks following infection, causing symptoms mimicking Crohn's disease. Anisakiasis may present as a gastric, intestinal, or allergic disease.

The first case of anisakiasis was reported from the Netherlands in the 1960s by Van Thiel, who described the presence of a marine nematode in a patient suffering from acute abdominal pain. It is frequently reported in areas of the world where fish is consumed raw, lightly pickled, or salted. The greatest numbers of published cases are Japan (from eating sashimi), Spain (from eating anchovies and other fish marinated in escabeche), South Korea, Italy, and the United States.

During the 1970s, about 10 cases per year were reported in the literature. The frequency is probably much higher, due to home preparation of raw or undercooked fish dishes. In Japan, more than 1,000 cases are reported annually. Development of better diagnostic tools and greater awareness has led to more frequent reporting of anisakiasis.

==== Diagnosis ====
Diagnosis can be made by gastroscopic examination, during which the 2-cm larvae are visually observed and removed, or by histopathologic examination of tissue removed at biopsy or during surgery.

Important clues for the diagnosis of anisakiasis include a recent history of eating raw or insufficiently cooked fish or squid followed by the sudden start of epigastric or right lower quadrant stomach pain. The removal and examination of the larva by gastroscopy or surgery provides a definitive diagnosis.

==== Prevention ====
Raising consumer and producer awareness about the existence of anisakid worms in fish is a critical and effective prevention strategy. Anisakiasis can be easily prevented by adequate cooking at temperatures greater than 60 °C or freezing. The FDA recommends all shellfish and fish intended for raw consumption be blast frozen to −35 °C or below for 15 hours or be regularly frozen to −20 °C or below for seven days. Salting and marinating will not necessarily kill the parasites, as in Italy where two-thirds of cases were attributed to anchovies marinated in lemon or vinegar. Humans are thought to be more at risk of anisakiasis from eating wild fish rather than farmed fish. Many countries require all types of fish with potential risk intended for raw consumption to be previously frozen to kill parasites. The mandate to freeze herring in the Netherlands has virtually eliminated human anisakiasis in the Netherlands, where it was previously common due to the consumption of infected fermented herrings (maatjes).

The best preventive measure for anisakiasis is to avoid eating raw or undercooked fish or squid. Another common prevention method is the thermal treatment of the fish or squid prior to consumption. The fish or squid should be cooked at >60 °C for >1 min or frozen whole at −20 °C for >24 h.

==== Treatment ====
For the worm, humans are a dead-end host. Anisakis and Pseudoterranova larvae cannot survive in humans, and eventually die. In some cases, the infection resolves with only symptomatic treatment. In other cases, however, the infection can lead to small bowel obstruction, which may require surgery, although treatment with albendazole alone (avoiding surgery) has been reported to be successful. Intestinal perforation (an emergency) is a possible complication.

=== Allergic reactions ===
Even when the fish is thoroughly cooked, Anisakis larvae pose a health risk to humans. Anisakids (and related species such as the sealworm, Pseudoterranova species, and the codworm Hysterothylacium aduncum) release many biochemicals into the surrounding tissues when they infect a fish. They are also often consumed whole, accidentally, inside a fillet of fish.

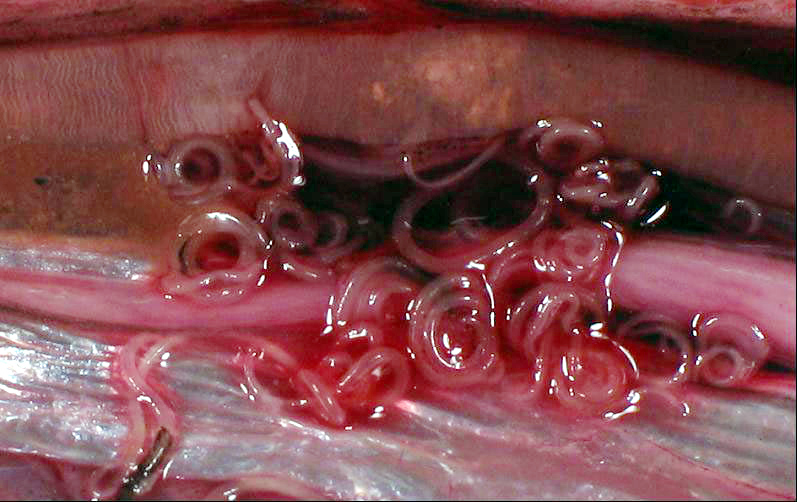
Anisakid larvae in the body cavity of a herring (Clupea harengus)

Acute allergic manifestations, such as urticaria and anaphylaxis, may occur with or without accompanying gastrointestinal symptoms. The frequency of allergic symptoms in connection with fish ingestion has led to the concept of gastroallergic anisakiasis, an acute IgE-mediated generalized reaction. Occupational allergy, including asthma, conjunctivitis, and contact dermatitis, has been observed in fish processing workers. Sensitization and allergy is determined by skin-prick test and detection of specific antibodies against Anisakis. Hypersensitivity is indicated by a rapid rise in levels of IgE in the first several days following consumption of infected fish. A 2018 review of cases in France has shown that allergic cases were more commonly found, although the number of human Anisakis infections was decreasing.

== Occurrence ==
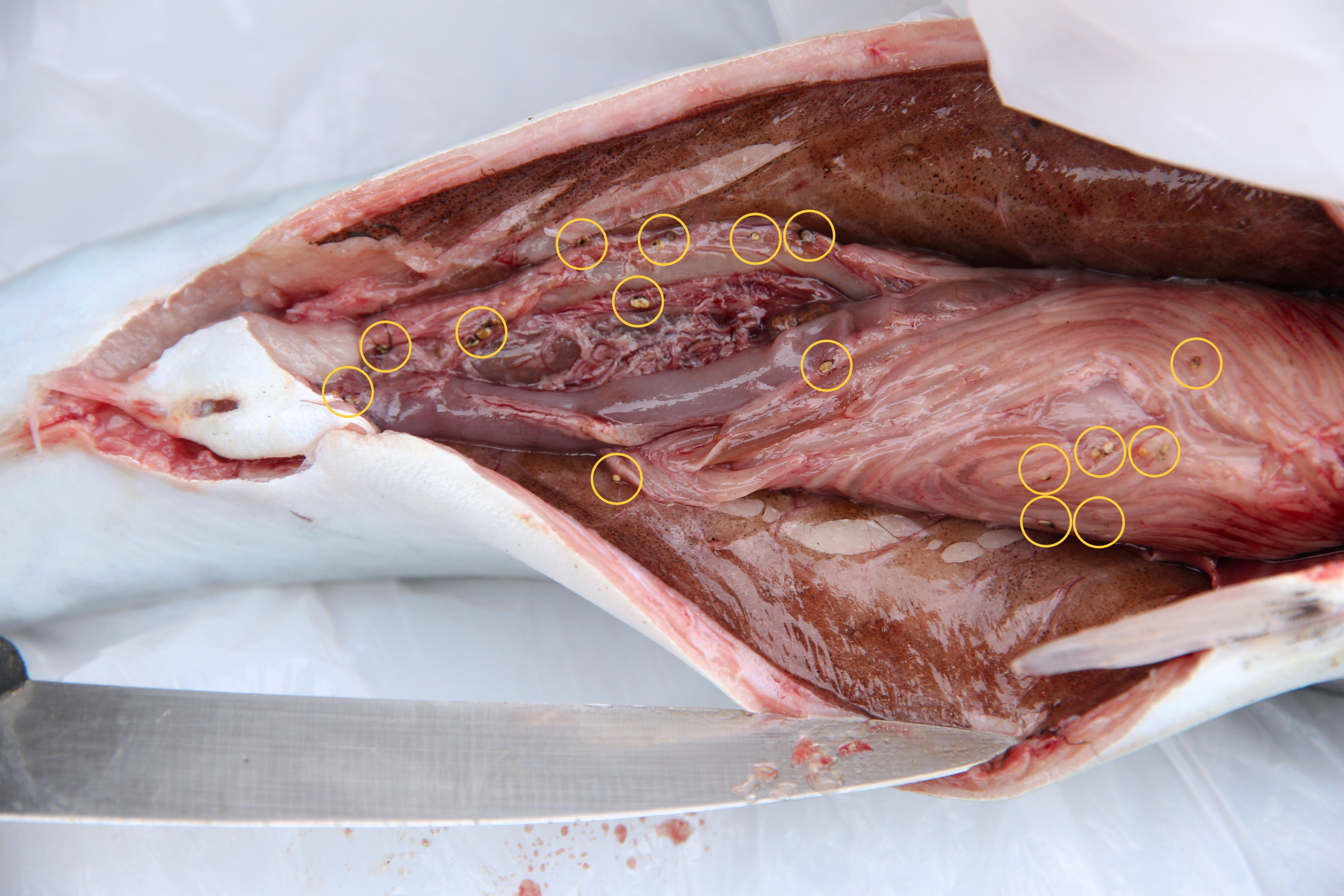
Anisakid larvae in the body cavity of a mackerel (Scomber scombrus)

Larval anisakids are common parasites of marine and anadromous fish (e.g. salmon, sardine), and can also be found in squid and cuttlefish. In contrast, they are absent from fish in waters of low salinity, due to the physiological requirements of krill, which are involved in the completion of the worm's life cycle. Anisakids are also uncommon in areas where cetaceans are rare, such as the southern North Sea. Due to having complex life cycles, species-specific relationships and their eggs being released in the feces of their definitive host, the identification of anisakids in local fish populations can be a useful tool in assessing the range or migratory patterns of their definitive host.

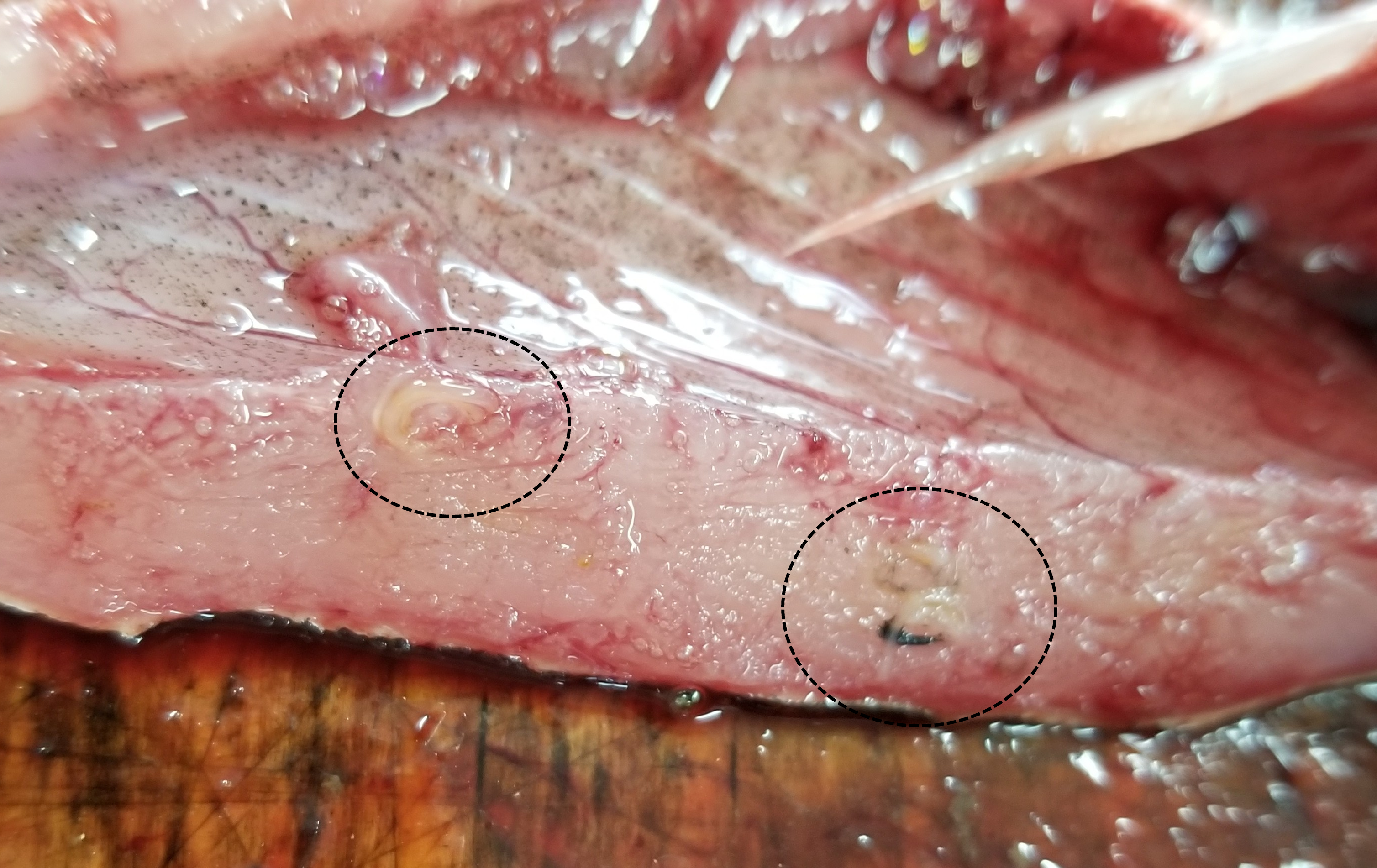
Anisakis larvae in the muscle of chub mackerel (Scomber japonicus)

Unusual hosts of Anisakis larvae in the Southern Hemisphere, rarely reported, include seabirds, sharks, or sea kraits.

== Taxonomy ==
There are currently 13 species known to exist in this genus, with 12 formally described and one additional species given a temporary name (A. simplex sensu Davey, 1971 is a temporary name). There are three additional species classified as taxon inquirendum (A. dussumierii (Brenden, 1870), A. insignis (Diesing, 1851), and A. salaris (Gmelin, 1790) Yamaguti, 1935). There is one other species classified as nomen dubium (A. diomedeae (Linstow)). An additional 17 species names are now currently considered synonyms for the 13 species believed to exist in this genus.

== Similar parasites ==
- Cod or seal worm Pseudoterranova (Phocanema, Terranova) decipiens
- Contracaecum spp.
- Hysterothylacium (Thynnascaris) spp.

== See also ==
- List of parasites of humans
