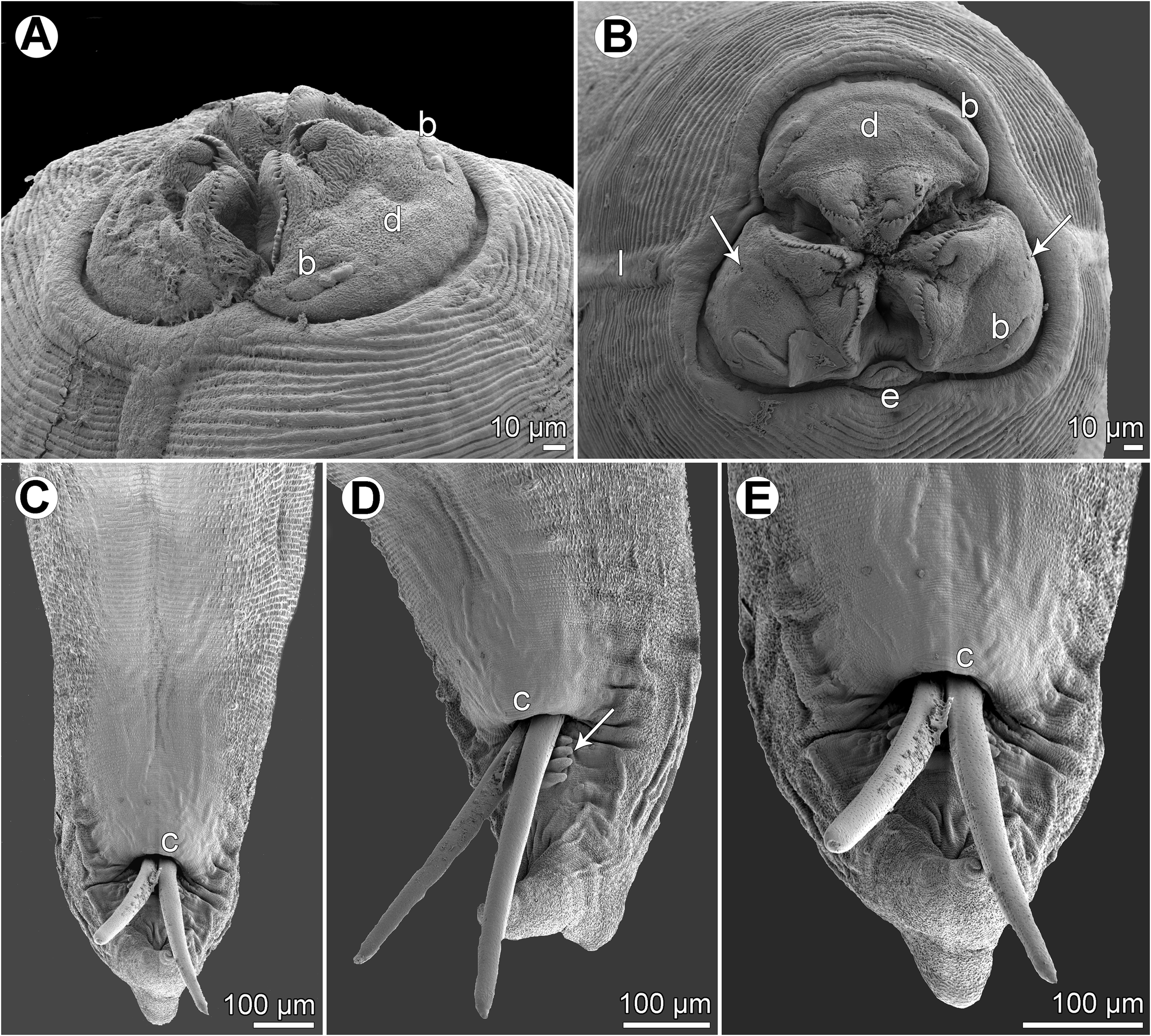
- Neoterranova scoliodontis

Scientific classification
- Kingdom: Animalia
- Phylum: Nematoda
- Class: Chromadorea
- Order: Rhabditida
- Family: Anisakidae
- Genus: Neoterranova; Moravec & Justine, 2020

Species
- N. scoliodontis (Baylis, 1931) Moravec & Justine, 2020 (Type species); N. caballeroi (Baruš & Coy Otero, 1966) Moravec & Justine, 2020; N. crocodili (Taylor, 1924) Moravec & Justine, 2020; N. lanceolata (Molin, 1860) Moravec & Justine, 2020

= Neoterranova =

Genus of parasitic nematodes

Neoterranova is a genus of parasitic nematodes that have life cycles involving sharks and reptiles. The genus was created in 2020 to accommodate species which were previously included inTerranova Leiper & Atkinson, 1914 a taxon considered to be invalid.

== Etymology ==
The name Neoterranova is composed of Terranova (the name of a nematode genus) and the prefix Neo- (= new). The gender is feminine.

== Species ==
The type-species is N. scoliodontis (Baylis, 1931) Moravec & Justine, 2020. It is a parasite of the stomach and intestine of the Tiger shark Galeocerdo cuvier, first described in 1931.

Other species are listed in the taxobox.

== See also ==
Euterranova
