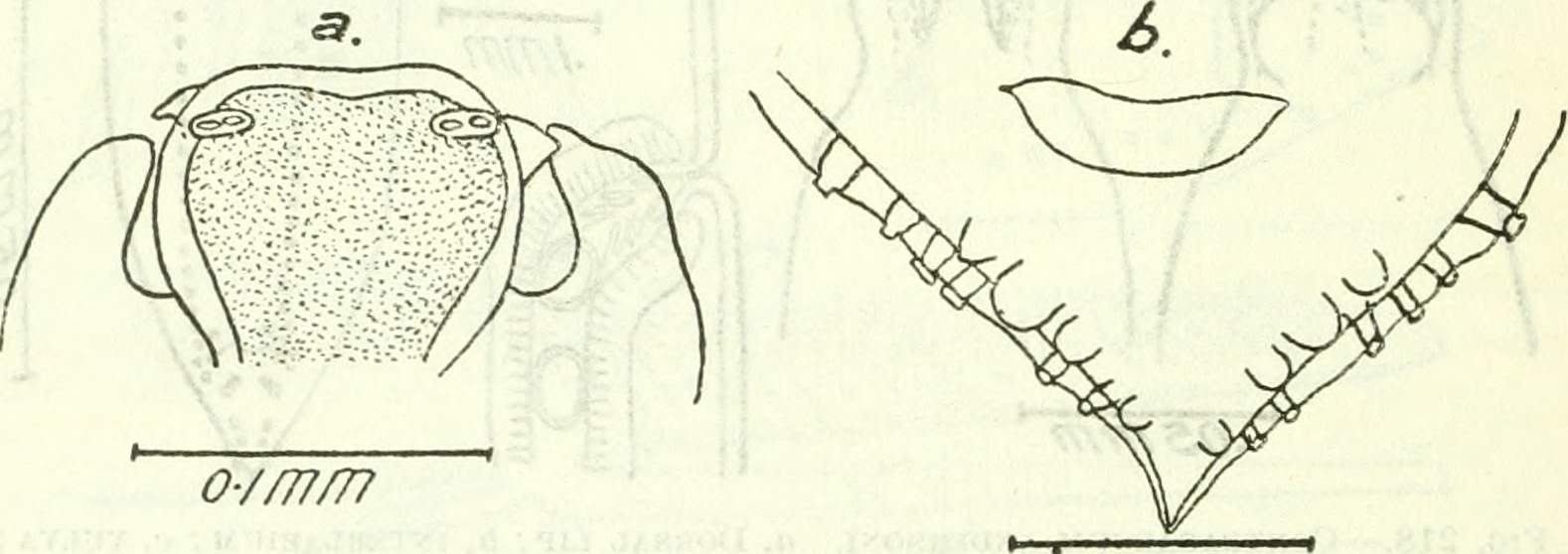
- Contracaecum engoxium. a, Head; b, male tail.

Scientific classification
- Kingdom: Animalia
- Phylum: Nematoda
- Class: Chromadorea
- Order: Rhabditida
- Family: Anisakidae
- Subfamily: Contracaecinae
- Genus: Contracaecum; Railliet & Henry, 1912

Synonyms
- Cerascaris Cobb, 1929; Kathleena Leiper & Atkinson, 1914

= Contracaecum =

Genus of roundworms

Contracaecum is a genus of parasitic nematodes from the family Anisakidae. These nematodes are parasites of warm-blooded, fish eating animals, i.e. mammals and birds, as sexually mature adults. The eggs and the successive stages of their larvae use invertebrates and increasing size classes of fishes as intermediate hosts. It is the only genus in the family Anisakidae which can infect terrestrial, marine and freshwater animals.

== Life cycle ==
The adults live as parasites in the stomachs of piscivorous birds and mammals. As third stage larvae they attach to the stomach of the species of fish which are preyed on by their definitive host. When the intermediate host fish is eaten and reached the warm stomach of its predator the larvae of Contracaecum moult twice into adult males and females, producing eggs which are expelled into water in the faeces of the host. Where the water is shallow the eggs or larvae descend to the sea bed. Here they may be consumed by invertebrates while those that float in the water column are ingested by various zooplankton. The small invertebrates and zooplankton are then eaten by larger organisms moving up the food chain until a fish suitable as a transport host consumes the larvae with the previous host. In this fish host, the larvae penetrate the wall of the intestinal tract into the organs and body cavity. The immune system of the fish reacts by producing a capsule of connective tissue around the larva, this capsule retains the larvae for the fish's life. Once an infected fish or the discarded guts of a cleaned fish are eaten by another fish, the capsule around the larvae are digested, freeing the larvae to restart this stage of its life cycle. In larger and older specimens of predatory fish there may be hundreds, possibly thousands of the larvae-containing capsules of connective tissue, these are all third-stage larvae and they are characterised by having and tooth-like structure on their head which is used to bore through the host's tissues. They have no reproductive organs at this stage.

Contracaecum nematodes are common in wild salmonids in the marine environment where they may occur abundantly. When they reach their final host they develop into adults. Dependent on the species of Contracaecum the definitive host can be mammals, including humans, birds, and in some cases, fish. In experiments third stage larvae of Contracaecum osculatum were shown to be infective of copepods, for example the larvae measuring 300-320 microns infected nauplius larvae of Balanus and small species of fish such as stickleback and eelpout. Larger fish such as flatfish and gobies were infected with the larvae by consuming the crustaceans while yet larger, predatory fish were infected by consuming these smaller fish. While the larvae were in the crustaceans they did not grow much, if at all. In the very small fish the larvae grew slowly and if a cod ate the small fish the smaller larvae died in the cod's liver and gut wall while the larger larvae travelled to the parenchyma of the liver. Here, some of the larvae attained lengths of up to 10 mm. Even so, some specimens of C. osculatum completed their life cycle using only a copepod host and a single intermediate host such as a stickleback.

== Distribution ==
The nematodes in the genus Contracaecum are found in seas throughout the globe. It is the most speciose genus in the Anisakidae.

== Effects on human health ==
Contracaecum larvae can infect humans, the human disease caused by infection of Anisakid nematodes such as Contracaecum is called anisakiasis (or anisakidosis) which is a painful and severe condition with infection usually being caused by the consumption of raw or undercooked fish which are host to the third stage larvae. The symptoms of anisakiasis include abdominal pain and distention, diarrhea and nausea, faeces with high proportions of blood and mucus and a mild fever. There can also be allergic reactions such as rash and itching, and occasionally there can also be anaphylaxis. Patients may require the removal of the parasite by endoscopy or surgery to treat this condition.

== Species ==
There are 142 species in the genus Contracaecum.
