= Raphidascaris =

Scientific classification
- Domain: Eukaryota
- Kingdom: Animalia
- Phylum: Nematoda
- Class: Chromadorea
- Order: Ascaridida
- Family: Raphidascarididae
- Genus: Raphidascaris; Railliet & Henry, 1915

Genus of nematodes

Raphidascaris is a genus of nematodes belonging to the family Raphidascarididae.

The species of this genus are found in Europe, Australia and Northern America.

Species:

- Hysterothylacium analarum Rye & Baker, 1984
- Hysterothylacium incurvum Rudolphi, 1819
