= Raphidascarididae =

Scientific classification
- Kingdom: Animalia
- Phylum: Nematoda
- Class: Chromadorea
- Order: Ascaridida
- Family: Raphidascarididae; Hartwich, 1954

Subfamilies, tribes, and genera
- Subfamily Goeziinae Travassos, 1919; Genus Goezia Zeder, 1800; Subfamily Raphidascaridinae Hartwich, 1954; Tribe Lappetascaridinea Rasheed, 1965; Genus Lappetascaris Rasheed, 1965; Genus Mehdiascaris Kalyankar, 1969 (taxon inquirendum); Tribe Paranisakinea Andersen, Chabaud & Willmott, 1974; Genus Ortoanisakis Mosgovoi, 1951; Genus Paranisakiopsis Yamaguti, 1941; Genus Paranisakis Baylis, 1923; Tribe Raphidascaridinea Hartwich, 1954; Genus Aliascaris Kalyankar, 1971; Genus Alibagascaris Kalyankar, 1970; Genus Heterotyphlum Spaul, 1920; Genus Hysterothylacium Ward & Magath, 1917; Genus Iheringascaris Pereira, 1935; Genus Paraheterotyphlum Johnston & Mawson, 1948; Genus Raphidascaris Railliet & Henry, 1915; Genus Raphidascaroides Yamaguti, 1941

Family of nematodes

Raphidascarididae is a family of roundworms (also known as nematodes) in the order Ascaridida. It encompasses nine genera (including Hysterothylacium, which parasitize marine fish, and Raphidascaris) and over 190 species.
