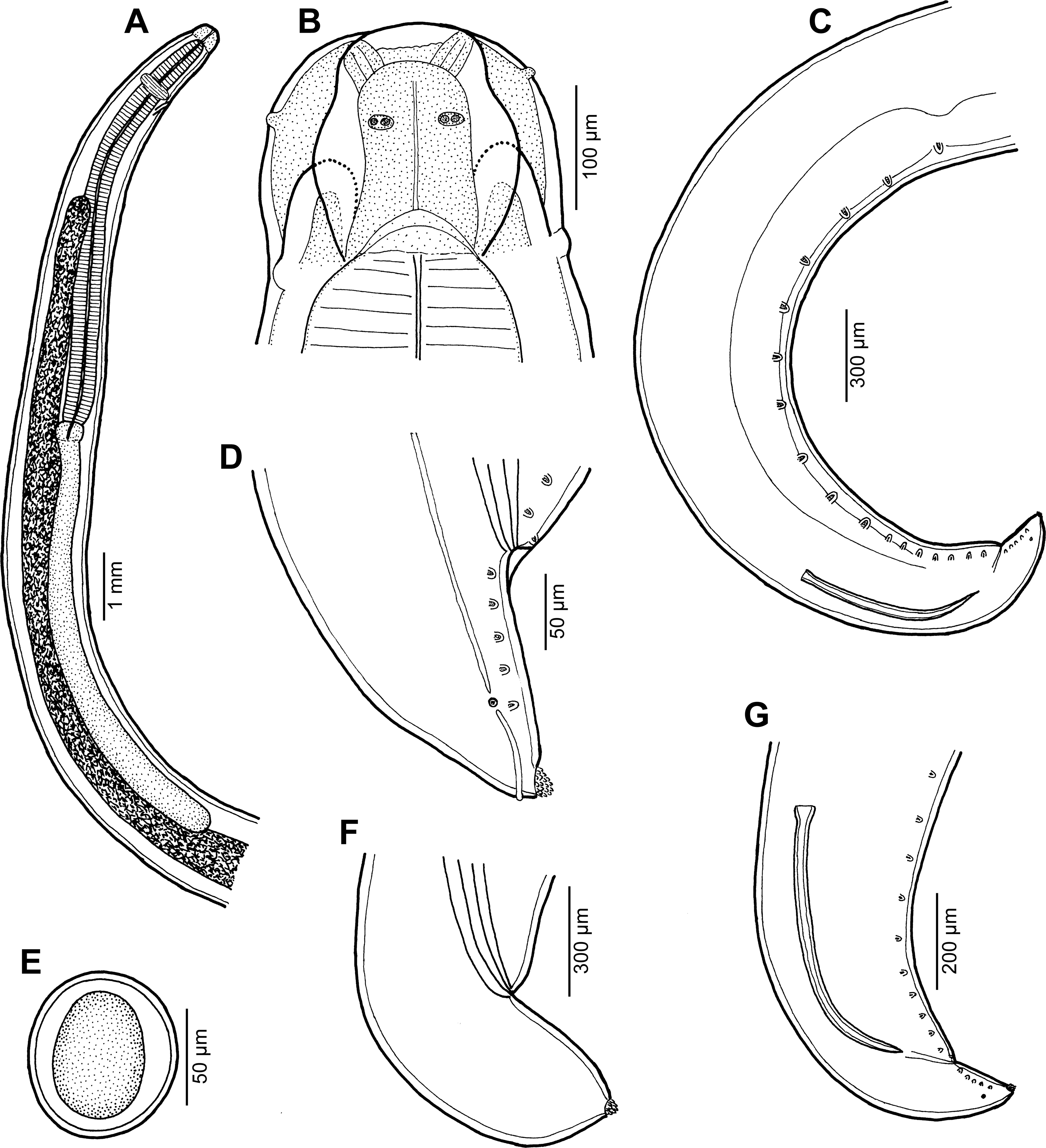
- Hysterothylacium epinepheli (Yamaguti, 1941)

Scientific classification
- Domain: Eukaryota
- Kingdom: Animalia
- Phylum: Nematoda
- Class: Chromadorea
- Order: Ascaridida
- Family: Raphidascarididae
- Genus: Hysterothylacium; Ward & Magath, 1917

= Hysterothylacium =

Genus of roundworms

Hysterothylacium is a genus of parasitic roundworms in the family Raphidascarididae. As of 2020 it consists of over 70 species and is considered one of the largest of the ascaridoid genera parasitising fish.

== Ecology ==
Species in the genus complete their life cycle between predatory teleost fish as their final host and various species of invertebrates and teleost as their intermediate hosts. These parasites are not host specific in the larval stages and infect a broad range of fish species; thus they are widely distributed throughout the aquatic ecosystem and exhibit a global distribution. Hysterothylacium aduncum infection in fish has been associated with mechanical damage to the heart, eye and fish musculature which occurs as a result of parasite larval migration. Catastrophic loss of fish fry due to infection with an unknown species of Hysterothylacium has been reported. Human infection is not common but has been reported in Japan.
