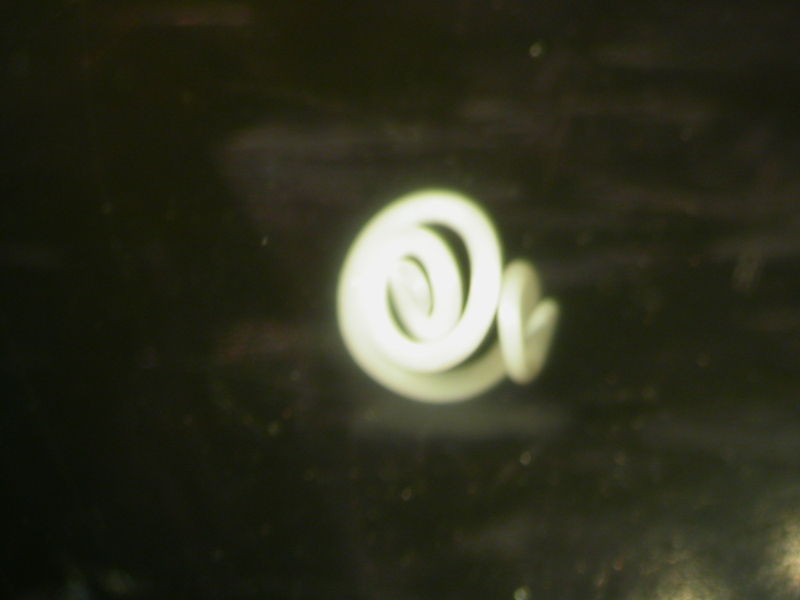

Scientific classification
- Kingdom: Animalia
- Phylum: Nematoda
- Class: Chromadorea
- Order: Rhabditida
- Family: Anisakidae
- Genus: Anisakis
- Species: A. simplex

Binomial name
- Anisakis simplex (Rudolphi, 1809)

Synonyms
- Ascaris simplex Rudolphi, 1809

= Anisakis simplex =

Species of parasitic nematode

Anisakis simplex, known as the herring worm, is a species of nematode in the genus Anisakis. Like other nematodes, it infects and settles in the organs of marine animals, such as salmon, mackerels and squids. It is commonly found in cold marine waters, such as the Pacific Ocean and Atlantic Ocean.

This species begins as an egg found in the feces of its host, and hatches as a second-stage larva in the ocean, where it survives for several days. This larva is then consumed by an intermediate host, usually a krill, and it develops into a third stage larva within the body of this intermediate host. The krill is then ingested by a predator, such as squid or fish, which act as the paratenic host for A. simplex. The worm reaches the end of its life cycle when the paratenic host is ingested by a whale or another marine mammal. In the abdominal cavity of this final host, A. simplex develops into a fully mature worm and reproduces to form eggs, which are then expelled from the body of the final host.

A. simplex generally possesses digestive and excretory organs, such as an oesophagus and intestine. However, its morphological structure changes as it develops from one life stage to another. When it is fully mature, it has defined lip structures, a regularly patterned outer surface, and fully developed reproductive organs.

The consumption of raw or undercooked seafood, such as sashimi and ceviche, puts humans at risk for developing an infection or allergic reaction caused by A. simplex. The worm can infect the stomach or intestine by lodging itself within the walls of the organ and producing digestive enzymes to penetrate mucus layers. It occasionally pierces through the wall completely and travels in the abdominal cavity. Acute symptoms, such as abdominal cramps, nausea and diarrhoea, arise hours after ingestion. The infection can be chronic if not treated. Treatment involves removal of the worm by endoscopy or surgery.

== Taxonomy ==
The Anisakis simplex is a parasitic roundworm classified under the phylum Nematoda. It possesses the typical characteristics of its phylum, including an unsegmented, cylindrical body that occasionally fills up with fluids and allows it to swim freely. Like other nematodes, Anisakis simplex communicates through its sense organs that detect chemicals and motion. These nematodes have the tendency to infect and inhabit the organs of other animals, who act as their host.

A. simplex is also part of the Anisakidae family and the Anisakis genus, which are specifically known for their potential to spread diseases from one species to another, starting with the infection of animals, such as fish, and eventually leading to transmission in humans.

== Morphology ==
Anisakis simplex, like typical worms from the Anisakidae has an oral pore, oesophagus, ventriculus, intestine and anal pore to aid with ingestion and excretion.

The morphological features of A. simplex change throughout its four stages of development. However, these features have only been examined in detail in its third and fourth larval stages.

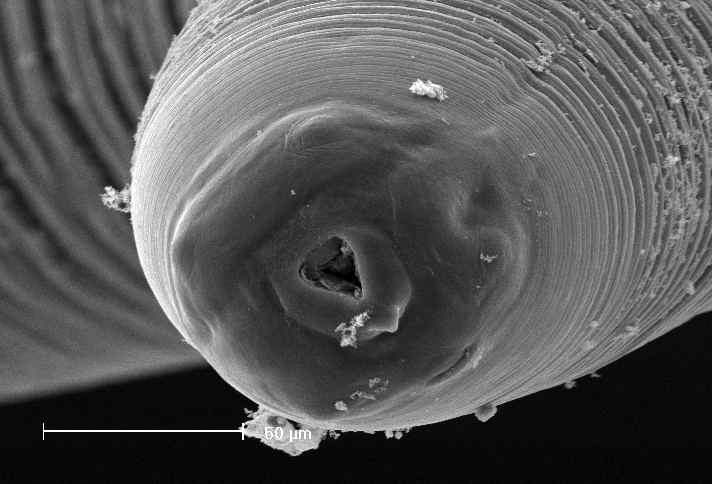
The anterior region of Anisakis simplex as seen on a scanning electron micrograph

In its early stages, the larva can be found in the faeces of its host, and is around 5mm in length, presenting a boring tooth and a bundle of sensory nerves at the front tip of its body. Once it develops into a third stage larva, it grows to a length of 20 to 30 mm, and is found in the body cavity of the host, either freely floating or enclosed in a protective sac attached to the main organs. At this stage, the larva appears to be cylindrical with narrowed ends, and are visibly pink and white in colour, with a small white mark in the frontal region. Its outer surface is textured with irregular indents and striations. There are three protruding segments around the mouth that form the lips, one that is dorsal and two that are ventrolateral, each with lobules on them. The two ventrolateral segments encase the triangular boring tooth and an excretory opening in front of it. The mouth then connects to the tubular esophagus that is visible from the frontal region and leads to the wideset ventriculus. A defining characteristic of this species is that the ventriculus is diagonally adjoined to the center of the intestine. At its rear end, the species has an anal opening, as well as spine-like structure known as the mucron.

Third stage larvae develop into their fourth and last stage days after being ingested by their final host. In fourth stage larvae, the three lip segments are still present, but the dorsal segment has grown to be larger than the ventrolateral ones, and the boring tooth is no longer present within them. At the rear end, the mucron is replaced by a cone-shaped protrusion with small globular structures on it, and the previously irregular striations and indents on the outer surface of the organism become regularly patterned. At this stage, female larvae begin to develop reproductive organs at the center of their bodies, including internal genitalia, uteri and surrounding papillae.

== Life cycle ==
There are four stages in the life cycle of A. simplex. The first stage includes emerging as an egg and hatching as larvae, and the following stages include being consumed by an intermediate host, a paratenic host, and lastly, a final host.

The egg of the A. simplex is first found in the fecal matter of its final host in an unembryonated form, and is visibly transparent and circular, with an evenly-surfaced shell. Once they are passed, embryos begin to develop within these eggs until they grow into second-stage larvae. The egg then hatches, and second stage larvae emerge into the sea enclosed in a protective sheath.

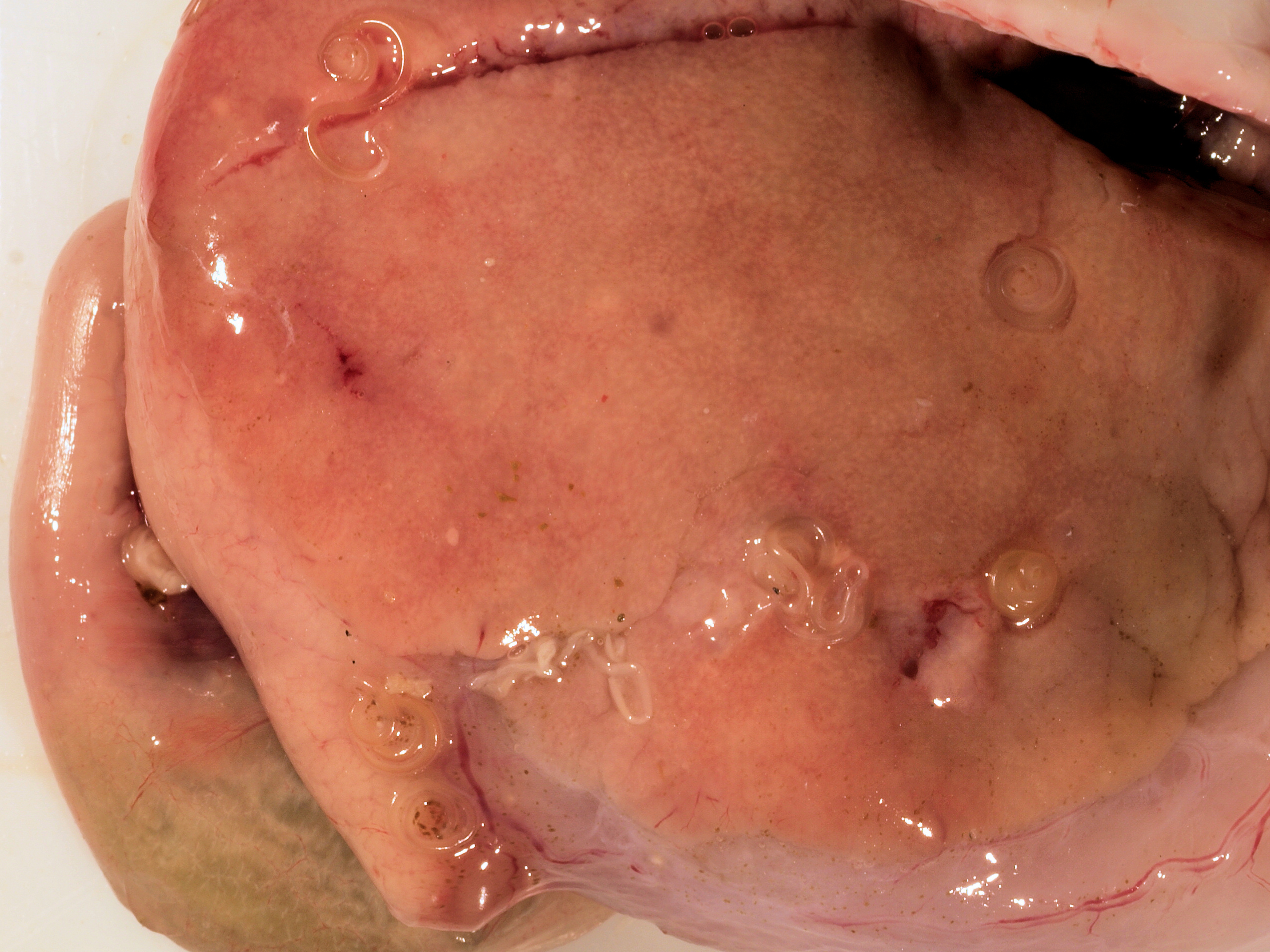
Anisakis simplex lodged in the liver of a cod fish

The temperature of the water affects the speed of hatching of the eggs. In warmer temperatures, eggs take between 4 and 8 days to hatch, but in temperatures below 5 °C, it may take up to 82 days. Once they are hatched, they can survive up to a month in warmer temperatures, and can last even longer in cooler temperatures below 10 °C. However, the release of eggs from the final host is unaffected by seasonal factors or temperatures, so the rate of infection by the species is stable throughout the year.

Once the eggs are hatched, second stage larvae are ingested by an intermediate host. This host is most commonly a krill or some other type of marine crustaceans. Upon ingestion, the larvae shed their protective sheath, then travel freely to the body cavity of the host to inhabit it. The change in the environment of the second stage larvae from the open water to the body of its host initiates their development into third stage larvae.

The krill infected by third stage larvae are then ingested by common predators, such as squid and fish, specifically teleosts, who then become paratenic hosts. These hosts are referred to as paratenic because third stage larvae do not develop further when inhabiting them. At this stage, the larvae no longer roam freely in the gut of the host, but are rather embedded in their viscera, specifically in the mucus layers of the stomach, and eventually make their way into the inner muscles. Certain species of paratenic hosts are sold and consumed by humans, including salmon, mackerel, cod, anchovy, sardine and squids.

Anisakis simplex reaches the end of its life cycle when the paratenic host is consumed by the final host, which are usually large marine mammals, such as whales, dolphins, and seals. Here, the third stage larvae make their way into the abdomen of the host, and moult two times to become fully mature organisms. They then embed themselves into the mucous lining of the stomach, and produce digestive enzymes to ingest it. At this stage, the worms are able to reproduce. Females attract a mate by releasing chemical signals, and a male then wraps around a female to reproduce.

== Distribution and habitat ==
The immediate habitat of A. simplex is within the body cavity of another marine animal, as it spends a majority of its life cycle being carried by these hosts. Its secondary habitats are the waterbodies in which these hosts reside. This includes the Pacific Ocean, the Atlantic Ocean, the Arctic Ocean and other regions characterised by cold marine waters. It is found along the coast and within the deeper regions of these waters.

The geographical distribution of this species is inferred based on the rates of human infection in different locations. The first case of human infection was discovered in the Netherlands in the 1960s. Since then, cases have been detected in other parts of Europe, including Germany, Spain, Italy and the United Kingdom. It has also been found in Egypt, Korea and parts of the America, such as Hawaii, Alaska and South America. However, it is most commonly detected in Japan.

The main factors affecting the distribution and survival of this species are salinity and average sea surface temperature. While higher temperatures reduce the time taken for their eggs to hatch, it also reduces their chance of long-term survival. However, higher salinity predicts longer survival times. Its distribution is also determined by locality, as it is specific to the aforementioned areas.

== Health implications ==
A. simplex can cause zoonotic diseases. The consumption or management of raw seafood puts humans at risk for developing an infection or allergic reaction caused by Anisakis simplex. The presence of a single worm in a human's body is enough to cause infection and elicit symptoms. In fact, this species is responsible for the majority of human infection cases within its family. Although such infections can be transmitted from animals to humans, it is not transmissible from one human to another.

=== Anisakiasis ===
Anisakiasis occurs when a parasitic worm, such as A. simplex, latches onto and penetrates the stomach or intestinal lining of a human, causing an infection. The infection is classified as gastric, intestinal, or ectopic based on the site of the lesion caused by the worm. A diagnosis is made based on an endoscopy of the relevant organs, or a histopathological examination of the affected tissue through surgery if the worm has already penetrated the walls of the organ and is not directly visibly anymore.

Acute symptoms, such as abdominal cramps, nausea, fever, diarrhoea, and bloating begin to appear within a few hours of ingestion and signals the onset of gastric anisakiasis. This infection is often mistaken for another illness, such as a peptic ulcer or food poisoning, because they share common symptoms. Occasionally, people can sense the tingling of the worm in their oesophagus directly after ingestion, and can vomit to expel it from their body and prevent infection. However, if the worm reaches the stomach, it uses its protruding lip segments to penetrate the gastric mucosa, and releases tissue-dissolving enzymes to eventually make its way into the submucosa. If left untreated, the infection can become chronic and cause symptoms such as dull stomachaches, indigestion and vomiting that lasts for months.

A typical endoscopy of the acute gastric form shows a worm embedded within the submucosa, with a visible lesion at the site of entry, and a thicker oedematous stomach lining. In patients with chronic gastric infection, there is often an ulcer or inflamed mass visible on the stomach lining.

Intestinal anisakiasis can be detected approximately one week after ingestion. Similar to the gastric form, the terminal ileum bears a lesion through which the larva has penetrated into the submucosa. The intestinal lining becomes inflamed and can triple in its thickness, swollen masses are present, and the lumen becomes constricted.

Ectopic anisakiasis occurs when the larvae bores through the gastrointestinal lining entirely, and travels to the surrounding organs in the abdominal cavity. It may even travel back to the oesophagus, where it can be regurgitated from the body.

=== Allergic reaction ===
Allergic reactions to A. simplex can arise in combination with a gastrointestinal infection, or on its own. The first sign of a reaction arises within the hour of consumption, but its severity varies for each individual. Some people experience mild urticaria, while others experience anaphylaxis or other clinically significant symptoms that can impair the functioning of the digestive, cardiovascular and several other body systems. A. simplex is responsible for a majority of allergic reaction cases in adults who just consumed seafood.

An allergy to A. simplex is diagnosed on the basis of three outcomes: a history of allergic reactions to seafood, the confirmation of relevant antibodies in an in vivo or in vitro test, and the absent role of fish proteins.

=== Epidemiology ===
Rates of human infection are highest in regions where raw or undercooked fish is commonly consumed. For example, the frequent consumption of ceviche in South America, smoked herring in the Netherlands, and pickled anchovies in Spain poses a high risk of infection in these regions. Although dishes such as sushi and sashimi are now consumed globally, Japan remains the country with the highest number of cases. 95% of global anisakiasis cases come from Japan.

=== Treatment ===
The worm is often removed during the gastrointestinal endoscopy, which alleviates the symptoms within hours. However, surgical removal of the affected tissue must be conducted when the worms are already buried deep in the viscera.

The allergic symptoms caused by A. simplex can be alleviated by anti-histamines, or other treatments that are commonly used for allergies.

=== Prevention ===
The elimination of raw or semi-cooked seafood is the most effective prevention method. According to FDA guidelines, seafood should be cooked at a temperature of at least 63 °C, and fish should be stored at a maximum temperature of −20 °C for 7 days or −35 °C for 15 hours for safe consumption. However, the allergens in A. simplex cannot be removed by heating or freezing processes.

== See also ==
- List of parasites of humans
