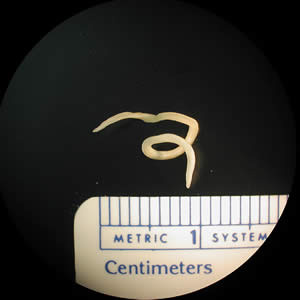

Scientific classification
- Kingdom: Animalia
- Phylum: Nematoda
- Class: Chromadorea
- Order: Rhabditida
- Family: Anisakidae
- Genus: Pseudoterranova

= Pseudoterranova =

Genus of roundworms

Pseudoterranova is a genus within the family Anisakidae of parasitic nematodes with an aquatic life cycle. The lifecycle of Pseudoterranova spp. involves marine mammals, pinnipeds (sea lions, seals and walruses), as definitive hosts, planktonic or benthic crustaceans as intermediate hosts and fish which act as second intermediate or paratenic hosts. In some regions, the rise in seal numbers has prefaced a significant increase in fish infected with P. decipiens which is of concern for fish health. Infection with Pseudoterranova may affect the health and swimming ability of the fish host and is therefore of concern for the survival of wild caught and farmed species. Species belonging to this genus have been demonstrated to cause illness of varying exigency in humans if raw or under cooked infected fish is consumed. Cases of human infection have been reported from consuming partially cooked fish infected with Pseudoterranova decipiens, Pseudoterranova cattani and Pseudoterranova azarasi. The propensity of P. decipiens to encyst in the edible portion of fish musculature may make this parasite a considerable threat to human health in undercooked fish.
