= Goezia =

Scientific classification
- Domain: Eukaryota
- Kingdom: Animalia
- Phylum: Nematoda
- Class: Chromadorea
- Order: Ascaridida
- Family: Raphidascarididae
- Genus: Goezia; Zeder, 1800

Genus of roundworms

Goezia is a genus of nematodes belonging to the family Raphidascarididae.

The species of this genus are found in Australia and Northern America.

Species:

- Goezia anguillae Lèbre & Petter, 1983
- Goezia annulata (Molin, 1859) Railliet & Henry, 1915
- Goezia ascaroides (Goeze, 1782) Railliet & Henry, 1915
- Goezia bangladeshi Akther, Alam, D'Silva, Bhuiyan, Bristow & Berland, 2004
- Goezia bilqeesae Gupta & Masoodi, 1990
- Goezia brasiliensis Moravec, Kohn & Fernandes, 1994
- Goezia chitali Zaidi & Khan, 1975
- Goezia fluviatilis Johnston & Mawson, 1940
- Goezia gavialidis Maplestone, 1930
- Goezia gobia Wang, 1965
- Goezia intermedia Rasheed, 1965
- Goezia kliksi Deardorff & Overstreet, 1980
- Goezia kollari (Molin, 1859)
- Goezia leporini Martins & Yoshitoshi, 2003
- Goezia minuta Chandler, 1935
- Goezia moraveci De & Dey, 1992
- Goezia nankingensis Hsü, 1933
- Goezia oncorhynchi Fujita, 1940
- Goezia pakistanica Bilqees, Fatima & Rehana, 1977
- Goezia parva W.
- Goezia pelagia Deardorff & Overstreet, 1980
- Goezia pseudoascaroides Rehana & Bilqees, 1972
- Goezia rasheedae Gupta & Masoodi, 1990
- Goezia sigalasi Stefanski, 1938
- Goezia sinamora Deardorff & Overstreet, 1980
- Goezia spinulosa (Diesing, 1839)
- Goezia tricirrata Osmanov, 1940
