= Robert Thomson Leiper =

Robert Leiper
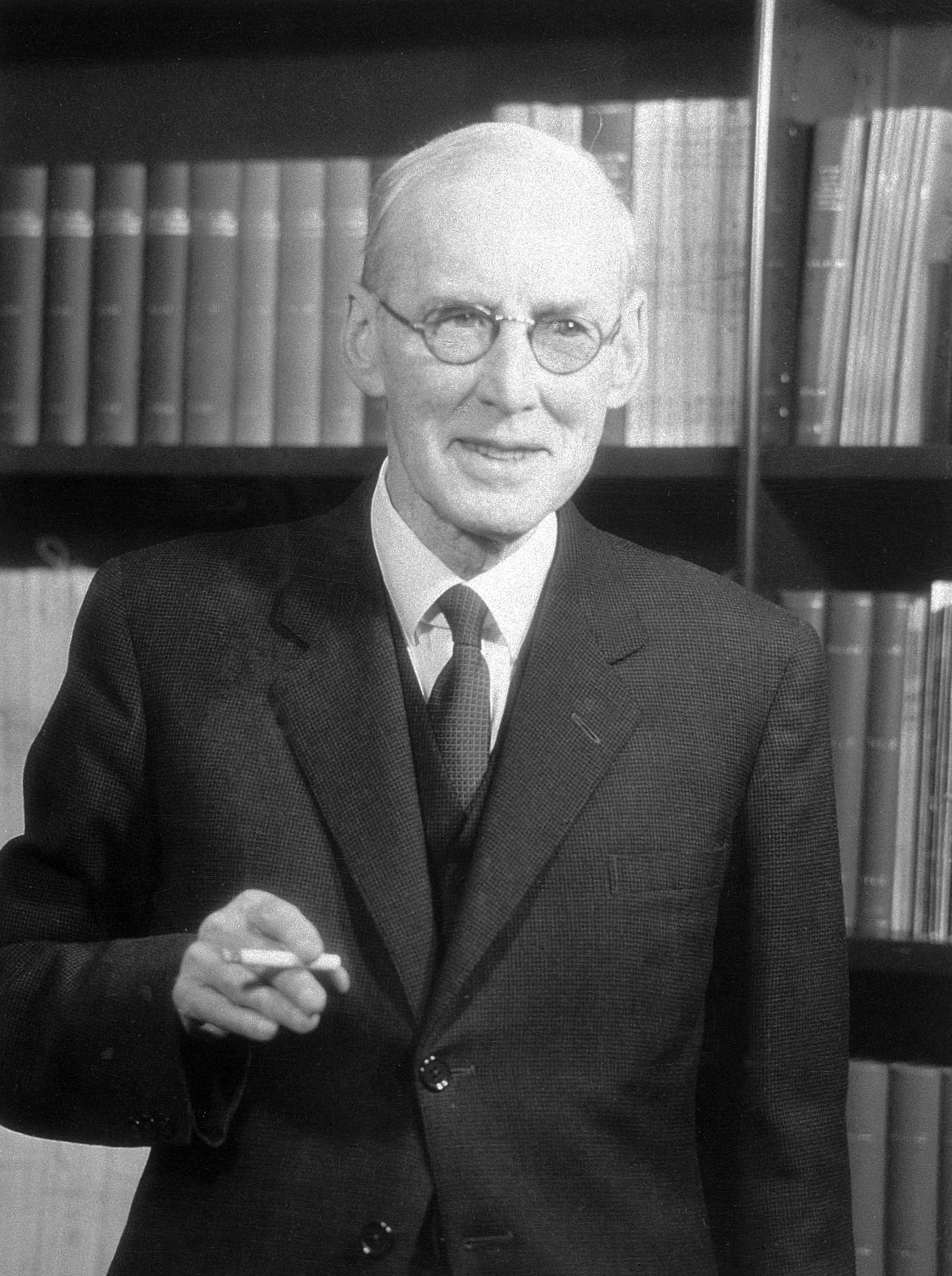
- Robert Thomson Leiper in 1960
- Born: Robert Thomson Leiper; 17 April 1881
- Died: 21 May 1969 (aged 88)
- Citizenship: British
- Spouse: Ceinwen Saron
- Children: one son and two daughters
- Awards: FRS CMG
- Scientific career
- Fields: Helminthology

Robert Thomson Leiper (17 April 1881 – 21 May 1969) FRS CMG was a British parasitologist and helminthologist.

== Early life and education ==
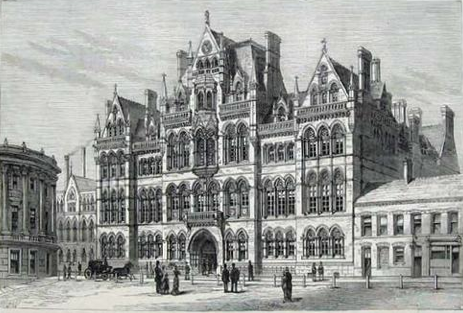
Mason Science College, now the University of Birmingham

Leiper was born on 17 April 1881 in Witch Road, Kilmarnock, Scotland; the eldest of three children of John Leiper (died 1895), tailor, and his wife, Jessie Aird.

The family moved to England shortly after he was born. He was educated at Warwick School, spending time at the Warwick Technical College to further his studies in science. He spent a year at Mason Science College (which later became the University of Birmingham), matriculating in physics, mathematics, English and Latin. He then entered the University of Glasgow to study medicine, at which he excelled, winning awards such as the John Hunter Medal and the Senior Arnott Prize in the field; graduating in 1904.

== Career ==
From an early age Leiper was devoted to helminthology, the study of parasitic flatworms; while still an undergraduate, at the age of 21, he discovered an undocumented turbellarian worm in the Spatangoida sea urchin. This discovery lead to the publication of his first paper in Nature magazine. He later, in 1923, founded the Journal of Helminthology. In that same year on 3 May he was made a Fellow of the Royal Society. He was appointed to the Fellow of the Royal College of Physicians in 1936, Order of St Michael and St George in 1941, and received an LLD degree from Glasgow University in 1955.

Leiper was the first professor of helminthology at the University of London and director of the helminthology course at the London School of Hygiene & Tropical Medicine. Leiper worked at LSHTM from 1905 until his retirement in 1947. During his time there he studied under Professor Arthur Looss at the University of Cairo and took part in the Egyptian Government's helminthological survey in Uganda.

== Personal life ==
In 1908, Leiper married Ceinwen Saron (died 1966), a dentist; they had one son and two daughters.

== See also ==
- Category:Taxa named by Robert Thomson Leiper
