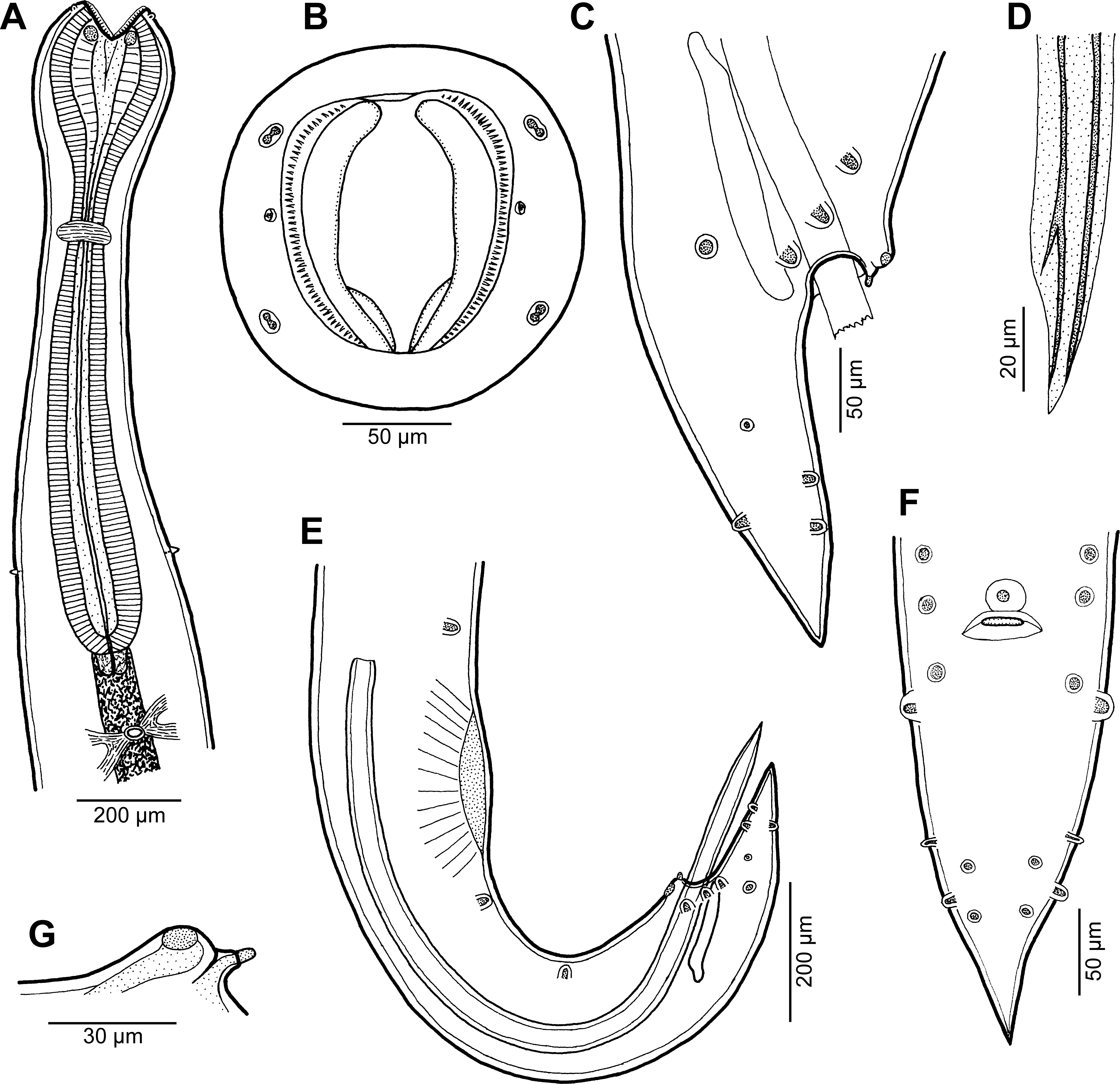

Scientific classification
- Kingdom: Animalia
- Phylum: Nematoda
- Class: Chromadorea
- Order: Rhabditida
- Family: Cucullanidae
- Genus: Cucullanus
- Species: C. gymnothoracis

Binomial name
- Cucullanus gymnothoracis Moravec & Justine, 2018

= Cucullanus gymnothoracis =

Species of roundworm

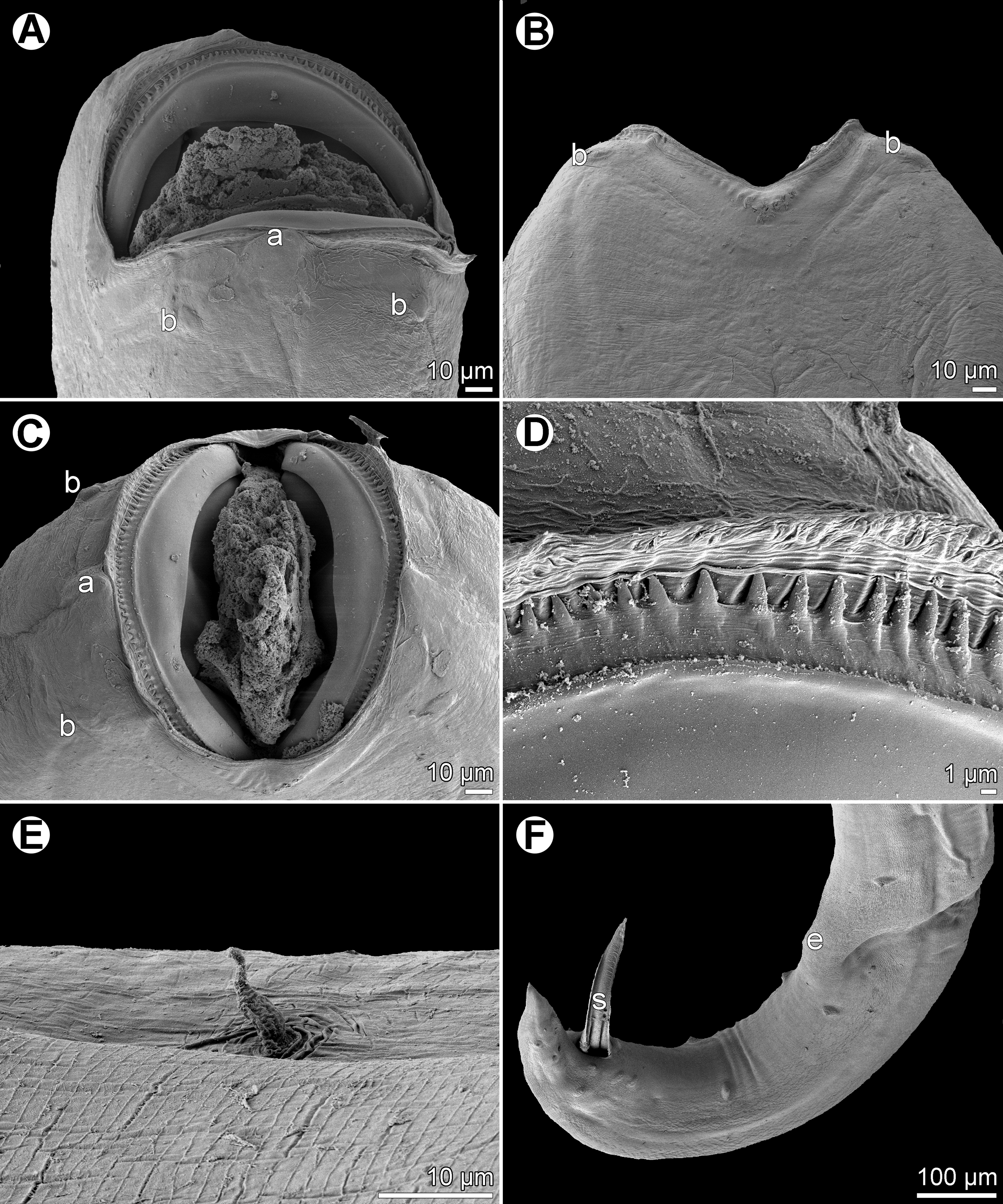
Cucullanus gymnothoracis, scanning electron microscopy

Cucullanus gymnothoracis is a species of parasitic nematodes. It is an endoparasite of the lipspot moray Gymnothorax chilospilus. The species has been described in 2018 by František Moravec & Jean-Lou Justine from material collected off New Caledonia in the South Pacific Ocean.

Cucullanus gymnothoracis was considered somewhat similar to Cucullanus austropacificus, but differs from this species in the absence of cervical alae and the posterior cloacal outgrowth, in the shape and size of the anterior cloacal outgrowth and shorter spicules 1.12 mm long.
