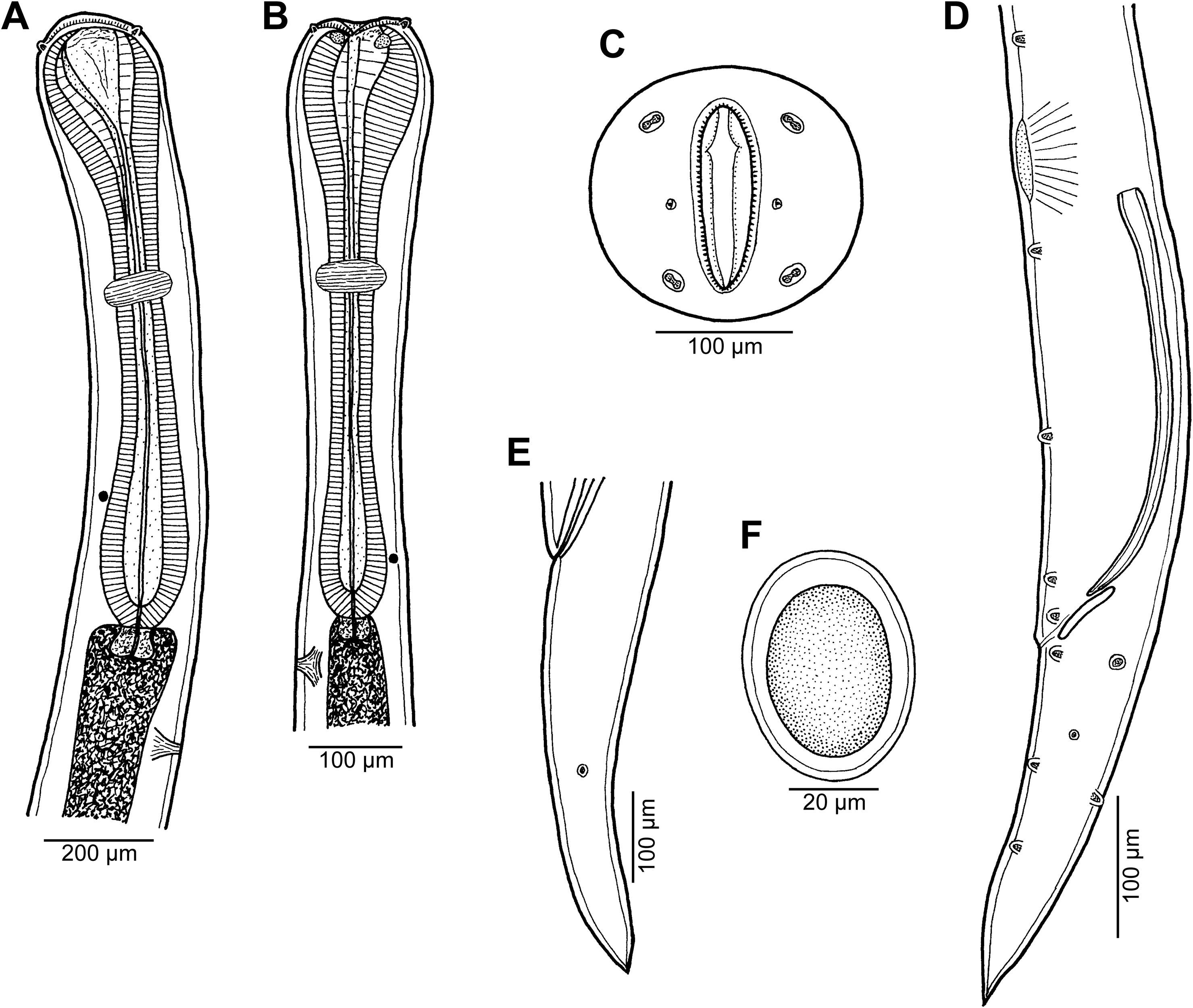

Scientific classification
- Domain: Eukaryota
- Kingdom: Animalia
- Phylum: Nematoda
- Class: Chromadorea
- Order: Rhabditida
- Family: Cucullanidae
- Genus: Cucullanus
- Species: C. diagrammae

Binomial name
- Cucullanus diagrammae Moravec & Justine, 2020

= Cucullanus diagrammae =

Species of roundworm

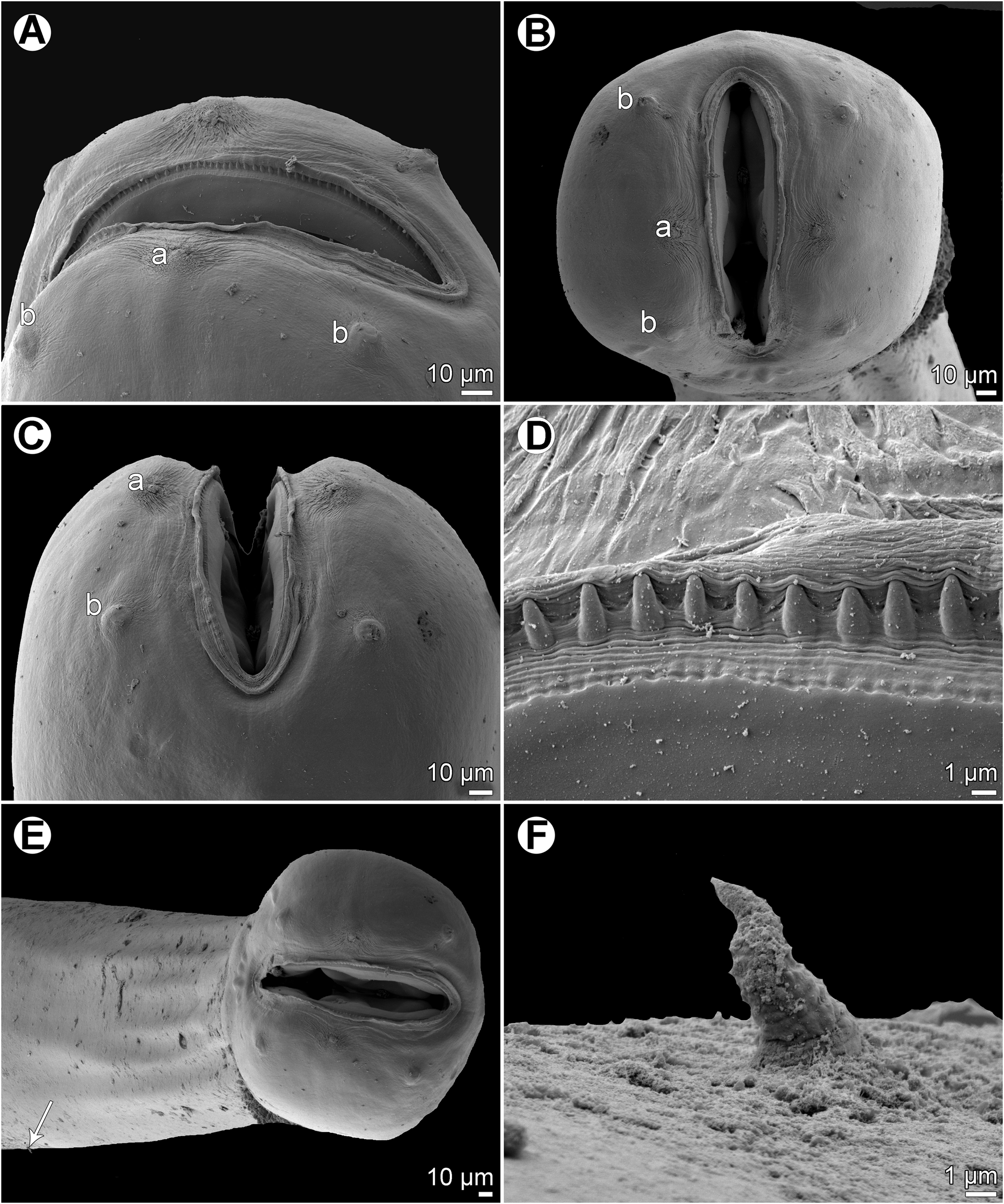
Cucullanus diagrammae, scanning electron microscopy

Cucullanus diagrammae is a species of parasitic nematodes. It is an endoparasite of a fish, the Painted sweetlips Diagramma pictum (Haemulidae, Perciformes). The species has been described in 2020 by František Moravec & Jean-Lou Justine from material collected off New Caledonia in the South Pacific Ocean.
