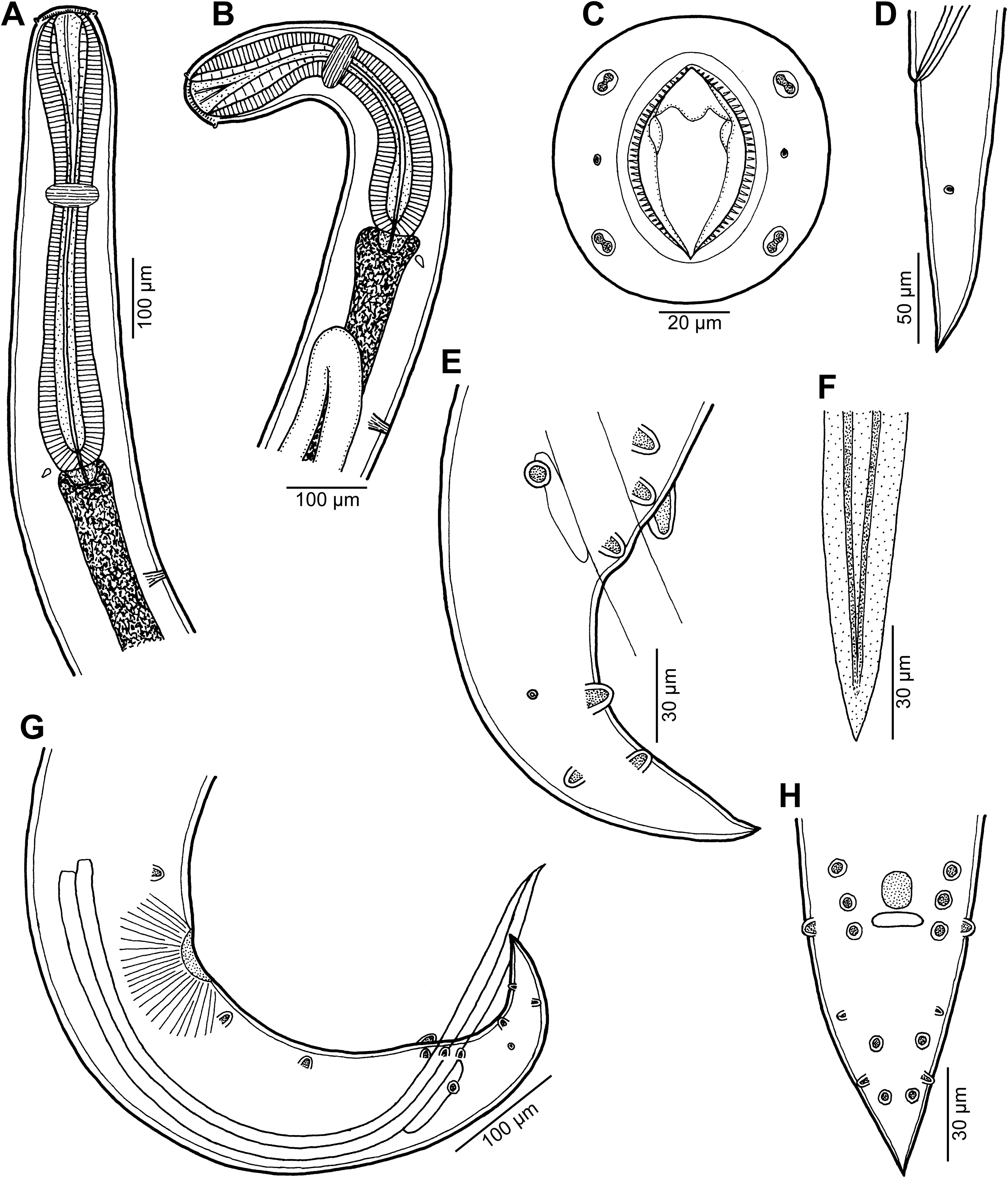

Scientific classification
- Domain: Eukaryota
- Kingdom: Animalia
- Phylum: Nematoda
- Class: Chromadorea
- Order: Rhabditida
- Family: Cucullanidae
- Genus: Cucullanus
- Species: C. acutospiculatus

Binomial name
- Cucullanus acutospiculatus Moravec & Justine, 2020

= Cucullanus acutospiculatus =

Species of roundworm

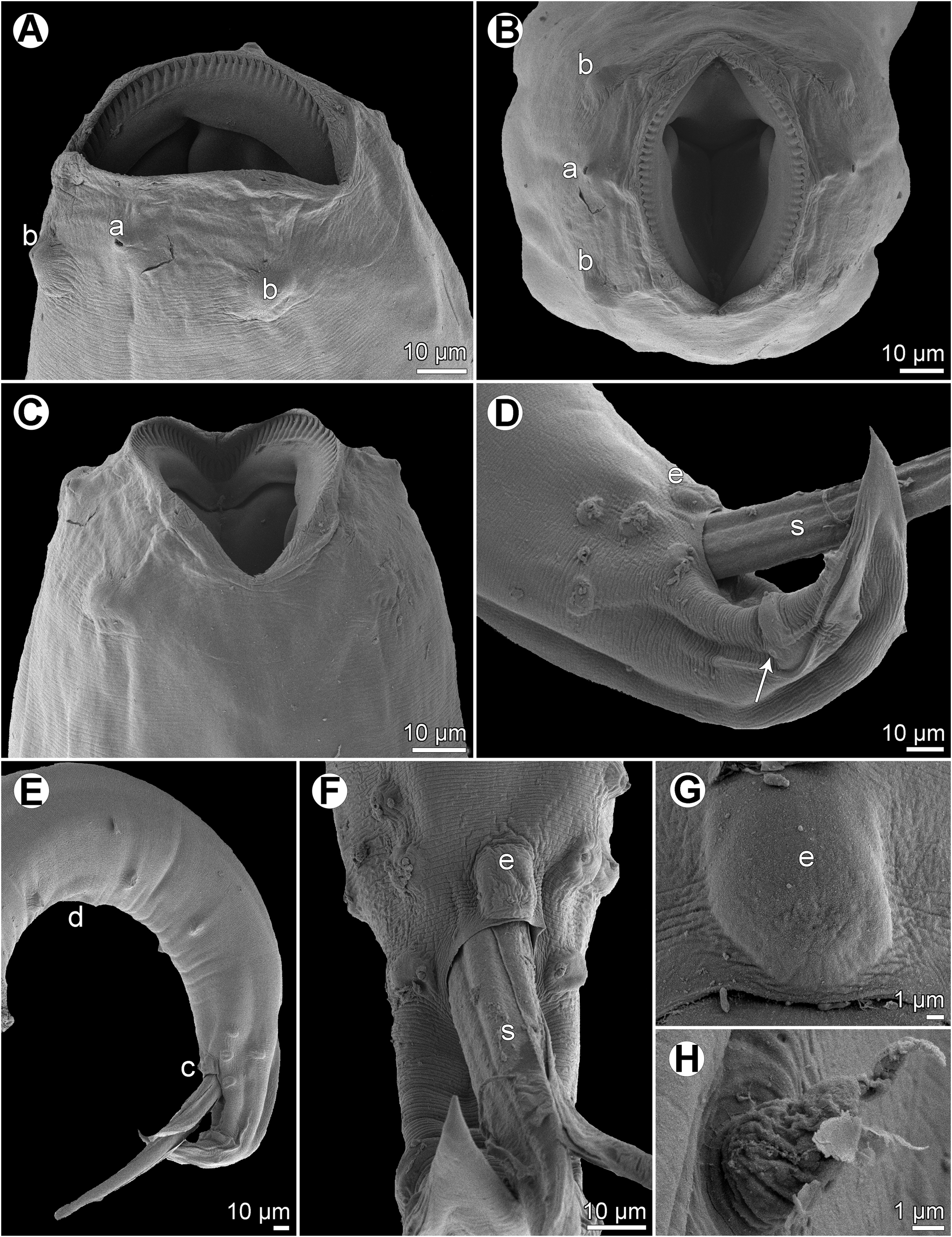
Cucullanus acutospiculatus, scanning electron microscopy

Cucullanus acutospiculatus is a species of parasitic nematodes. It is an endoparasite of a fish, the redbelly yellowtail fusilier, Caesio cuning (Caesionidae, Perciformes). The species has been described in 2020 by František Moravec & Jean-Lou Justine from material collected off New Caledonia in the South Pacific Ocean.
