= Cucullanus epinepheli =

Scientific classification
- Domain: Eukaryota
- Kingdom: Animalia
- Phylum: Nematoda
- Class: Chromadorea
- Order: Rhabditida
- Family: Cucullanidae
- Genus: Cucullanus
- Species: C. epinepheli

Binomial name
- Cucullanus epinepheli Moravec & Justine, 2017

Species of roundworm

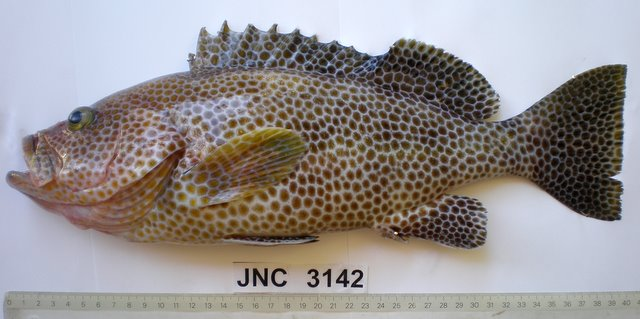
The brown spotted reef cod Epinephelus chlorostigma is the host of Cucullanus epinepheli

Cucullanus epinepheli is a species of parasitic nematodes. It is an endoparasite of the brown spotted reef cod Epinephelus chlorostigma. The species has been described in 2018 by František Moravec & Jean-Lou Justine from material collected off New Caledonia in the South Pacific Ocean.

Cucullanus epinepheli was characterized from other members of the genus Cucullanus mainly in possessing a unique structure of the anterior, elevated cloacal lip with a large posterior outgrowth covering the cloacal aperture and in the presence of cervical alae and two small preanal papillae on the median dome-shaped precloacal elevation.
