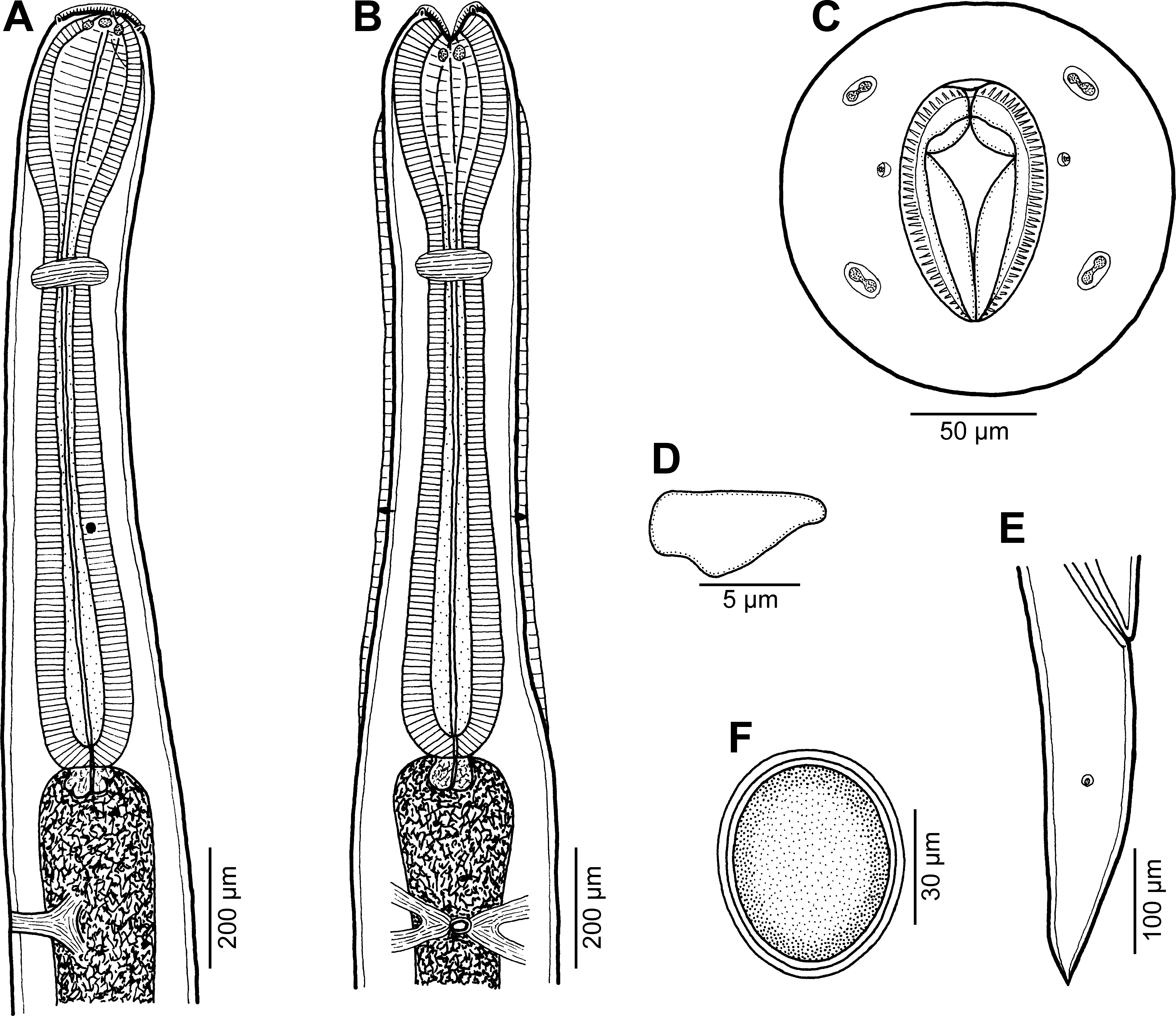

Scientific classification
- Kingdom: Animalia
- Phylum: Nematoda
- Class: Chromadorea
- Order: Rhabditida
- Family: Cucullanidae
- Genus: Cucullanus
- Species: C. incognitus

Binomial name
- Cucullanus incognitus Moravec & Justine, 2018

= Cucullanus incognitus =

Species of roundworm

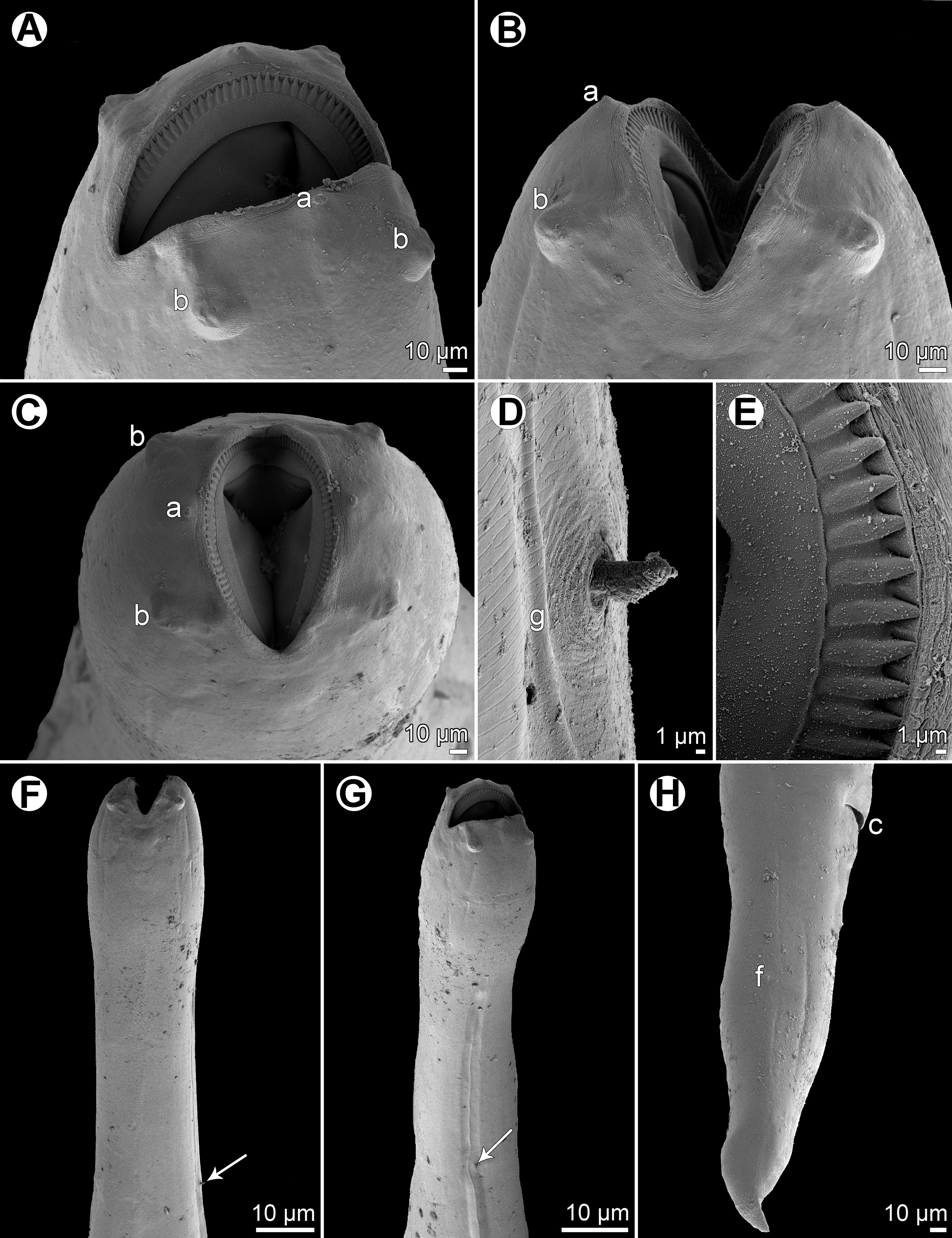
Cucullanus incognitus, scanning electron microscopy

Cucullanus incognitus is a species of parasitic nematodes. It is an endoparasite of the rare sparid fish Dentex fourmanoiri. The species has been described in 2018 by František Moravec & Jean-Lou Justine from material collected off New Caledonia in the South Pacific Ocean. Only female specimens were found.

Cucullanus incognitus was characterized from other species of Cucullanus parasitic on Sparidae by the following morphological features (based on female morphology only): presence of cervical alae, postequatorial vulva and phasmids situated at the mid-length of the tail and the size of the eggs (75–84 × 45–66 μm).
