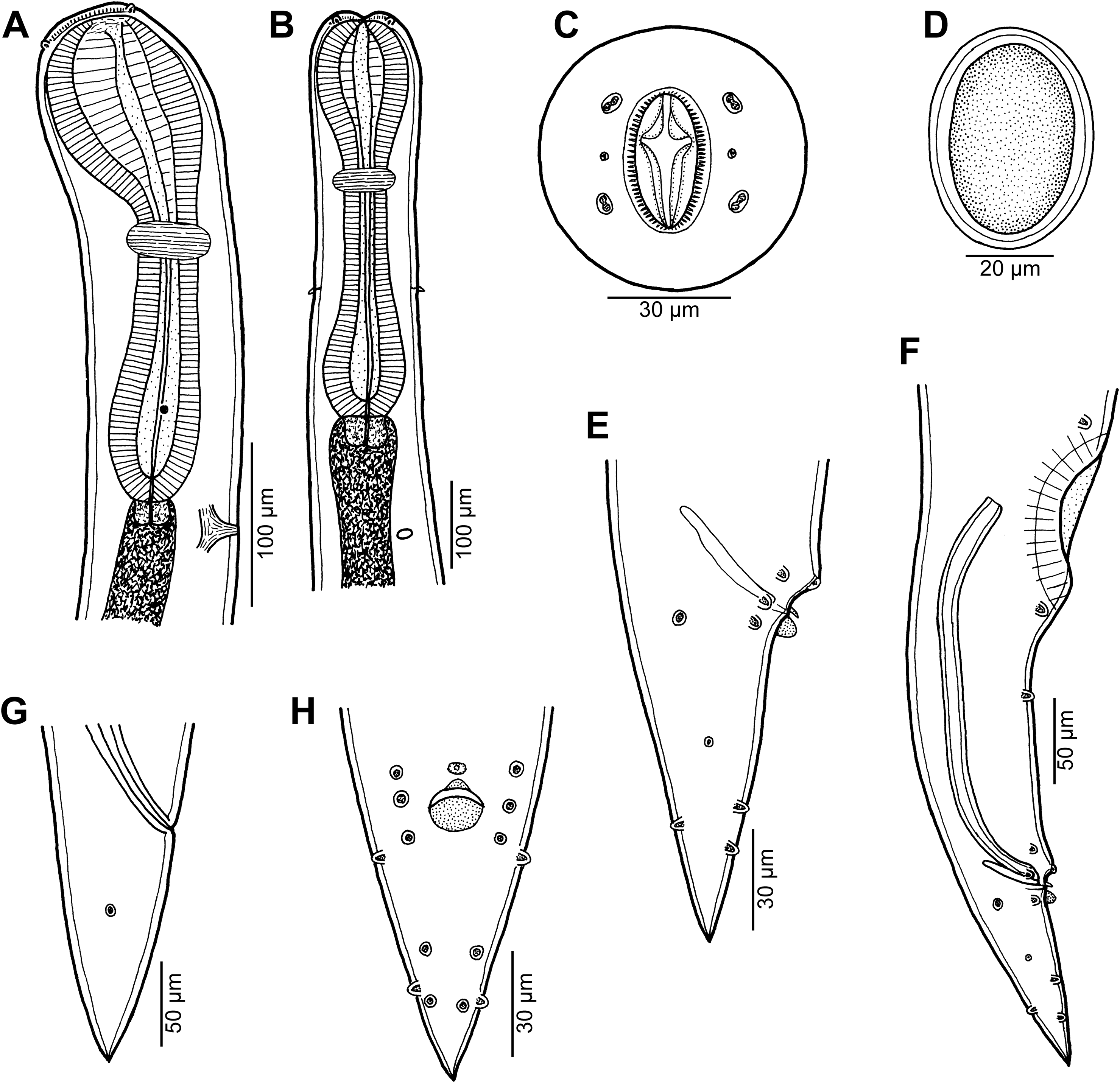

Scientific classification
- Domain: Eukaryota
- Kingdom: Animalia
- Phylum: Nematoda
- Class: Chromadorea
- Order: Rhabditida
- Family: Cucullanidae
- Genus: Cucullanus
- Species: C. parapercidis

Binomial name
- Cucullanus parapercidis Moravec & Justine, 2020

= Cucullanus parapercidis =

Species of roundworm

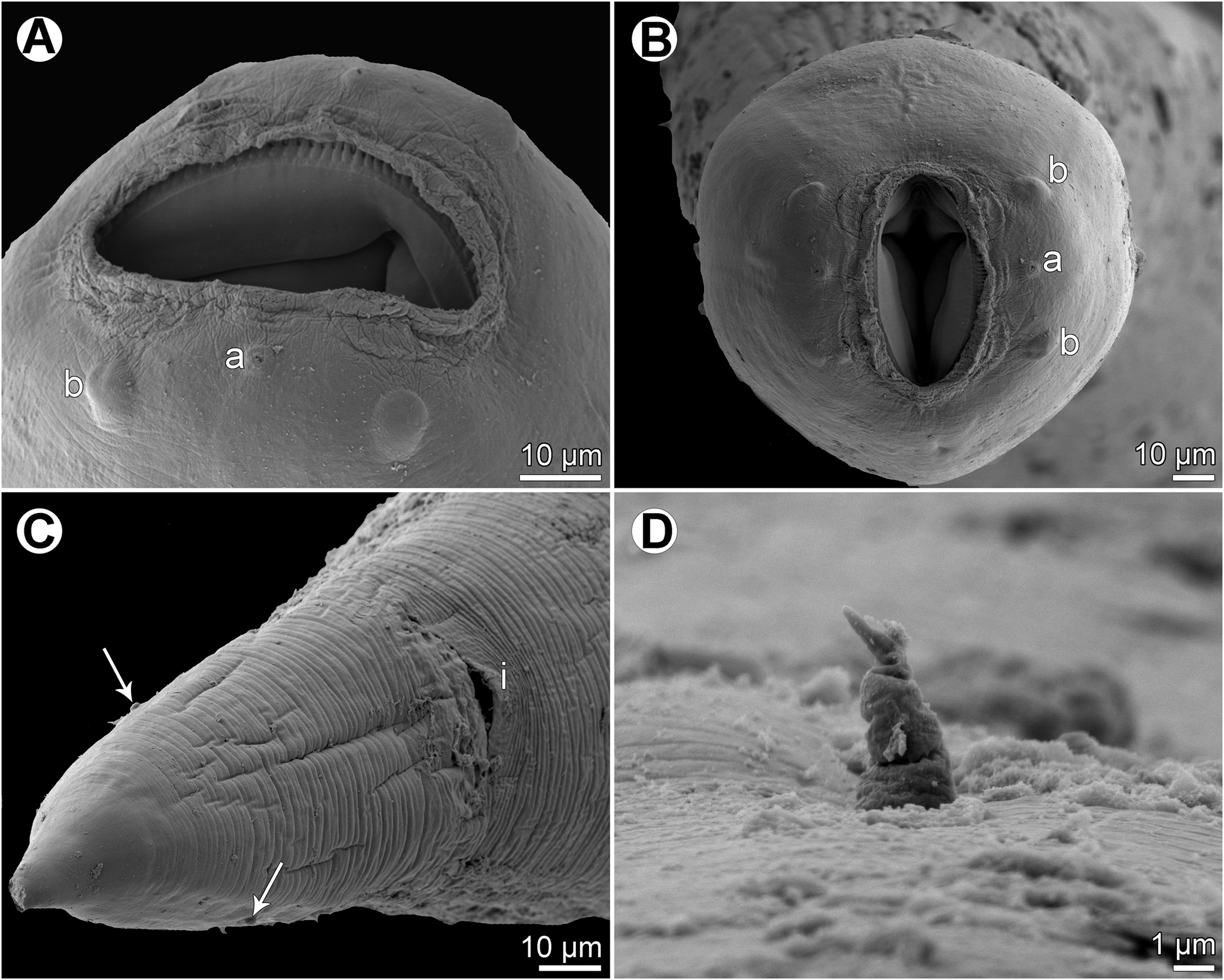
Cucullanus parapercidis, scanning electron microscopy

Cucullanus parapercidis is a species of parasitic nematodes. It is an endoparasite of fish, the Yellowbar sandperch Parapercis xanthozona (Pinguipedidae, Perciformes), which is the type-host, and the Speckled sandperch Parapercis hexophtalma. The species has been described in 2020 by František Moravec & Jean-Lou Justine from material collected off New Caledonia in the South Pacific Ocean.
