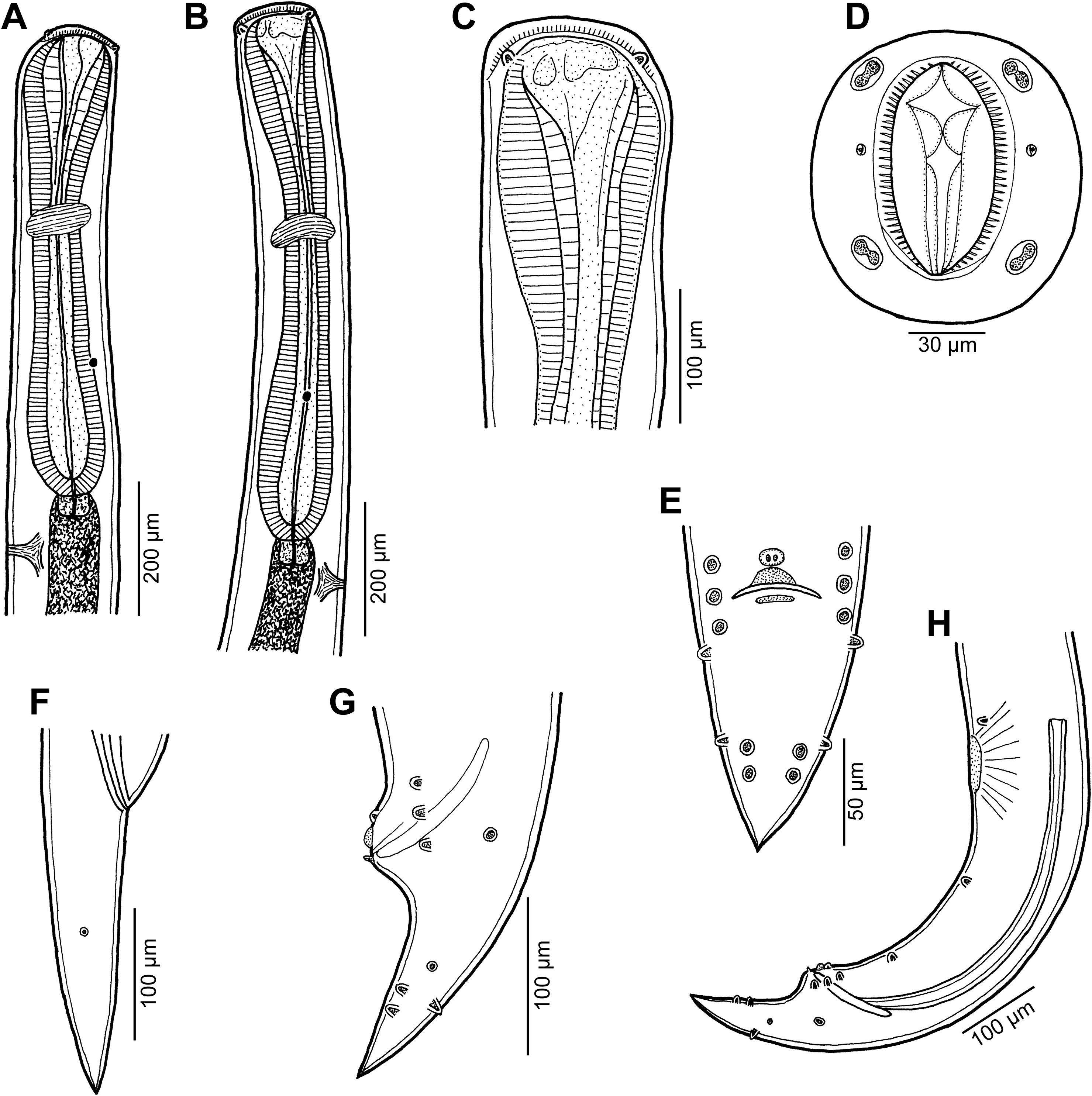
- Cucullanus petterae

Scientific classification
- Kingdom: Animalia
- Phylum: Nematoda
- Class: Chromadorea
- Order: Rhabditida
- Family: Cucullanidae
- Genus: Cucullanus
- Species: C. petterae

Binomial name
- Cucullanus petterae Moravec & Justine, 2020

= Cucullanus petterae =

Species of roundworm

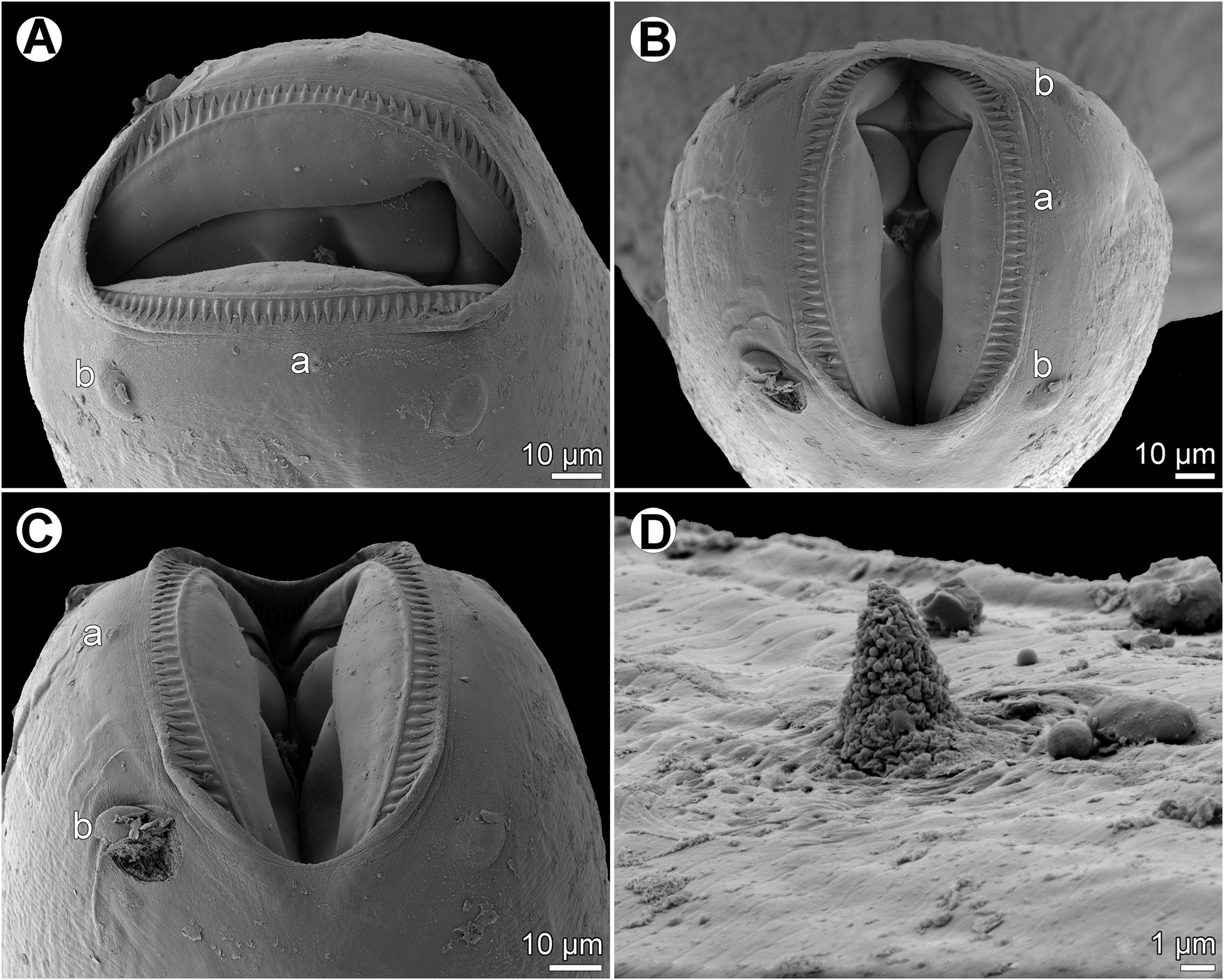
Cucullanus petterae, scanning electron microscopy

Cucullanus petterae is a species of parasitic nematodes. It is an endoparasite of fish, the Honeycomb grouper Epinephelus merra (Serranidae, Perciformes), which is the type-host, and the Blacktip grouper Epinephelus fasciatus. The species has been described in 2020 by František Moravec & Jean-Lou Justine from material collected off New Caledonia in the South Pacific Ocean.

The name of the species honours Annie Petter, eminent French nematodologist (1932–2017).
