= Hisinger =

Hisinger is a Scandinavian surname. Notable people with the surname include:

- Eduard Hisinger (1832–1904), Finnish politician and biologist
- Wilhelm Hisinger (1766–1852), Swedish chemist and mineralogist
