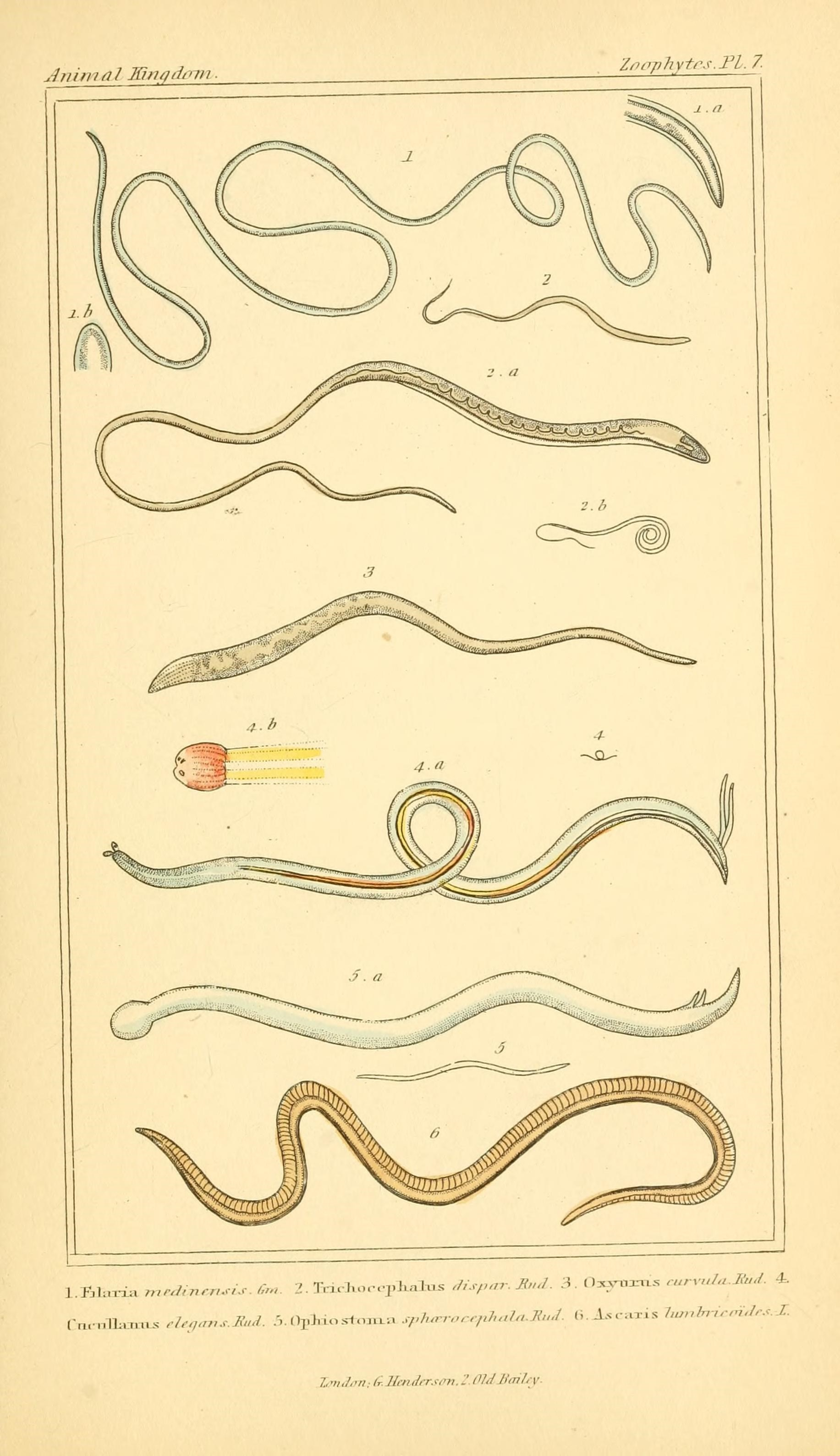

Scientific classification
- Domain: Eukaryota
- Kingdom: Animalia
- Phylum: Nematoda
- Class: Chromadorea
- Order: Rhabditida
- Family: Cucullanidae
- Genus: Cucullanus
- Species: C. elegans

Binomial name
- Cucullanus elegans Zeder, 1800 or Rudolphi, 1802

= Cucullanus elegans =

Species of roundworm

Cucullanus elegans is a species of parasitic nematode. It is an endoparasite of the European perch (Perca fluviatilis).

Cucullanus elegans Zschokke, 1884, C. elegans Sramek, 1901, C. elegans Levander, 1926 and C. elegans Ruszkowski, 1926 are synonyms for Camallanus lacustris.
