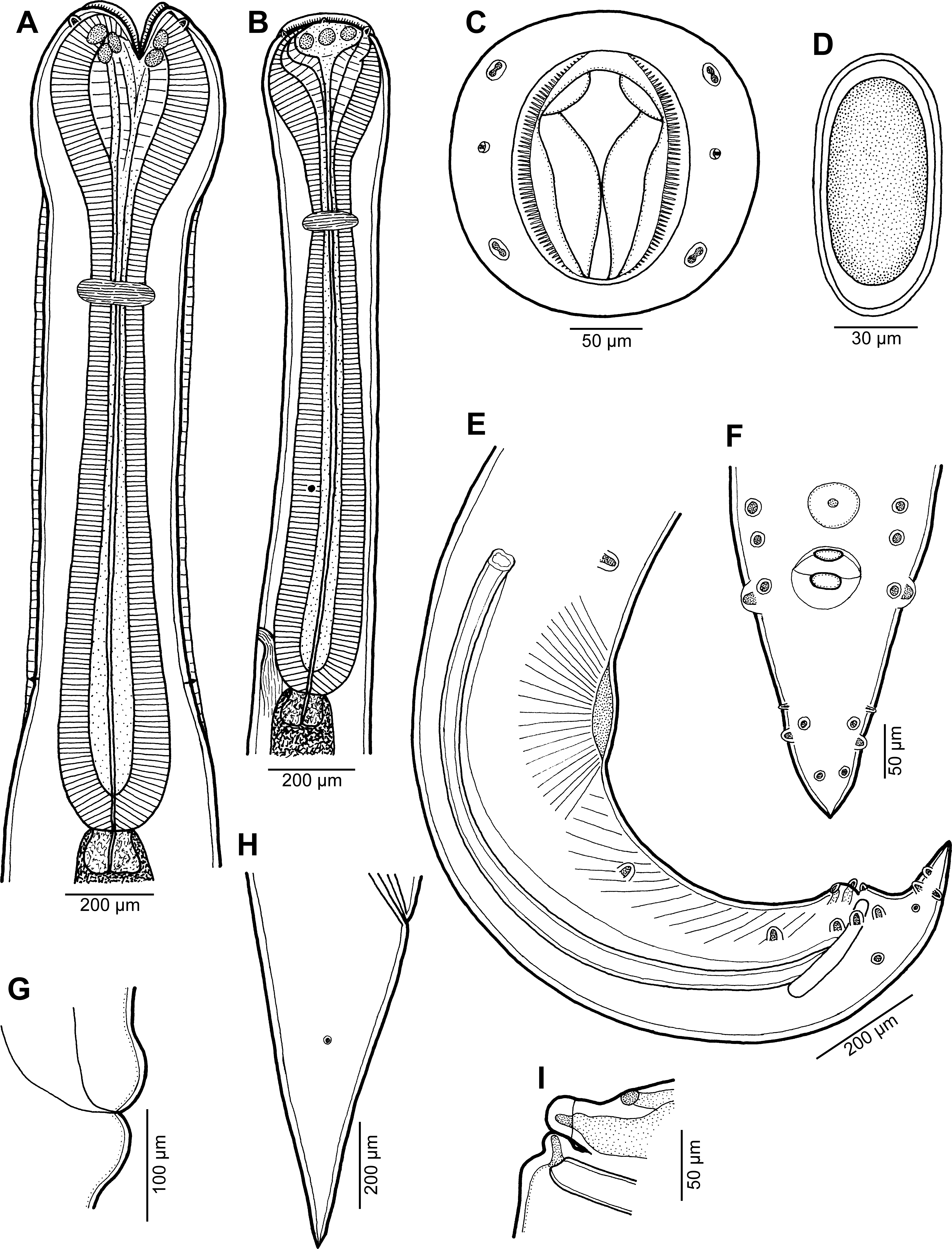

Scientific classification
- Kingdom: Animalia
- Phylum: Nematoda
- Class: Chromadorea
- Order: Rhabditida
- Family: Cucullanidae
- Genus: Cucullanus
- Species: C. austropacificus

Binomial name
- Cucullanus austropacificus Moravec & Justine, 2018

= Cucullanus austropacificus =

Species of roundworm

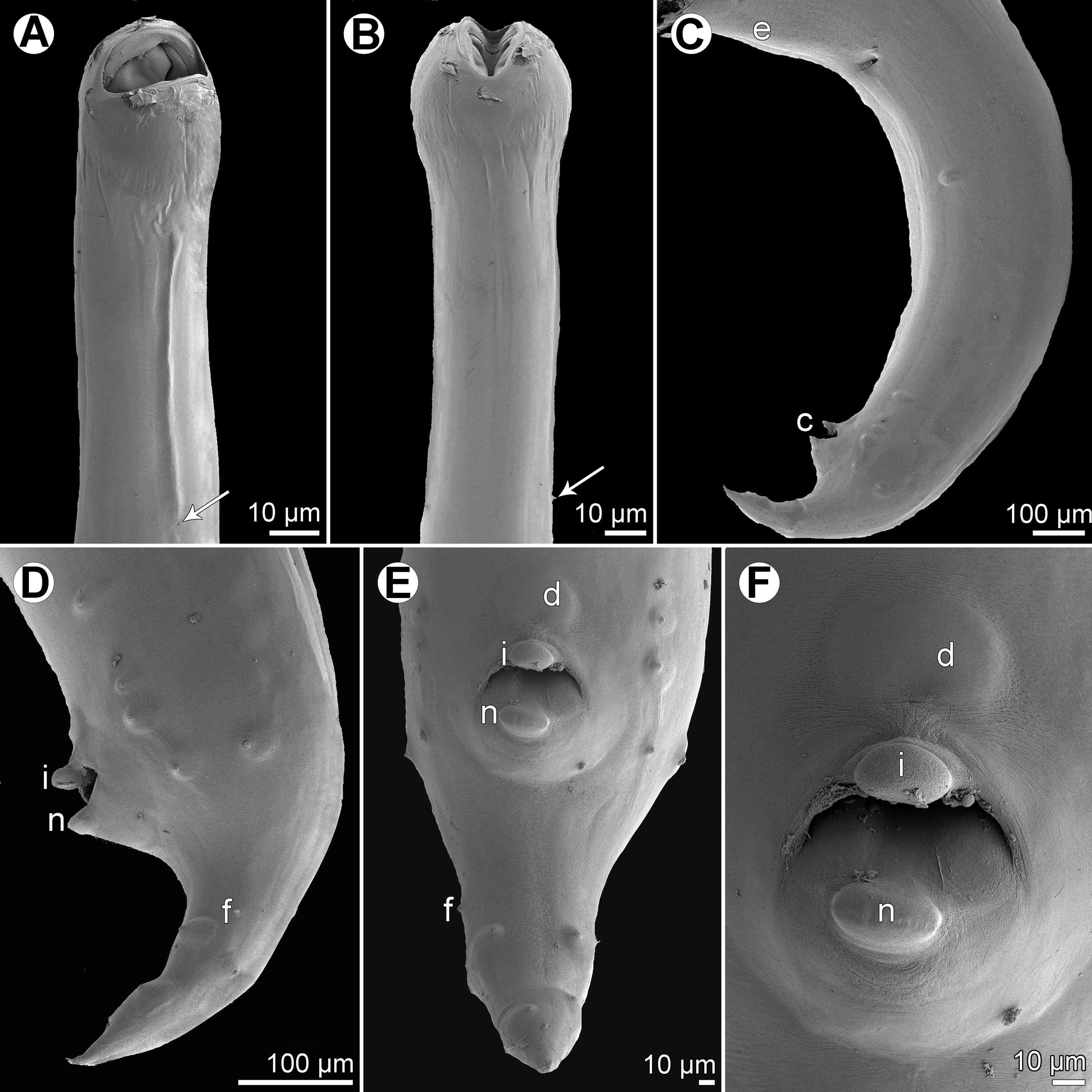
Cucullanus austropacificus, scanning electron microscopy

Cucullanus austropacificus is a species of parasitic nematodes. It is an endoparasite of the fish Conger cinereus. The species has been described in 2018 by František Moravec & Jean-Lou Justine from material collected off New Caledonia in the South Pacific Ocean.

Cucullanus austropacificus was characterized by the following morphological features: presence of cervical alae, ventral sucker, alate spicules 1.30–1.65 mm long, conspicuous outgrowths of the anterior and posterior cloacal lips and elongate-oval eggs measuring 89–108 × 48–57 μm.
