= Dichelyne =

Scientific classification
- Kingdom: Animalia
- Phylum: Nematoda
- Class: Chromadorea
- Order: Rhabditida
- Family: Cucullanidae
- Genus: Dichelyne; Jägerskiöld, 1902

Genus of roundworms

Dichelyne is a genus of nematodes belonging to the family Cucullanidae.

The genus has almost cosmopolitan distribution.

Species:

- Dichelyne abbreviatus (Rudolphi, 1819)
- Dichelyne adriaticus (Tornquist, 1931)
- Dichelyne alatae De & Maity, 1995
- Dichelyne amaruincai (Freitas, Vicente & Ibañez, 1969)
- Dichelyne bodiani Moravec & Justine, 2019
- Dichelyne bonacii González-Solís, Arqáez-García & Guillén-Hernández, 2002
- Dichelyne branchiostegi (Yamagutui, 1941) Petter, 1974
- Dichelyne bullocki Stromberg & Crites, 1972
- Dichelyne cnidoglanis (Johnston & Mawson, 1945)
- Dichelyne cotylophora (Ward & Magath, 1917)
- Dichelyne dichelyneformis (Szidat, 1950) Petter, 1974
- Dichelyne diplocaecum Chandler, 1935
- Dichelyne elongatus (Törnquist, 1931)
- Dichelyne etelidis Moravec & Justine, 2011
- Dichelyne exiguus (Yamaguti, 1954)
- Dichelyne fossor Jägerskiöld, 1902
- Dichelyne fraseri (Baylis, 1929)
- Dichelyne jialaris Luo, Guo, Fang & Huang, 2004
- Dichelyne kanabus (Walder & Arai, 1974)
- Dichelyne laticeps Baylis, 1948
- Dichelyne leporini Petter, 1989
- Dichelyne longispiculata
- Dichelyne longispiculus Wang & Lin, 1975
- Dichelyne lothari Cerna, Torres & Silva, 2019
- Dichelyne mariajuliae Alarcos, Timi, Etchegoin & Sardella, 2006
- Dichelyne mauritanicus (Gendre, 1928)
- Dichelyne micropogonii Pereira & Costa, 1996
- Dichelyne minutus (Rudolphi, 1819)
- Dichelyne moraveci Petter, 1995
- Dichelyne pimelodi Moravec, Kohn & Fernandez, 1997
- Dichelyne pleuronectidis (Yamaguti, 1935)
- Dichelyne pomadasysi Vassilaides & Petter, 1981
- Dichelyne rasheedae Petter, 1974
- Dichelyne robustus (Van Cleave & Mueller, 1932)
- Dichelyne rodriguesi (Pinto, Fabio & Norhona, 1970)
- Dichelyne romani Isbert, Montero, Carrasson & Gonzalez-Solis, 2015
- Dichelyne sciaenidicola Timi, Lanfranchi, Tavares & Luque, 2009
- Dichelyne sheardi (Johnston & Mawson, 1944)
- Dichelyne spinicaudatus Petter, 1974
- Dichelyne szidati Timi & Sardella, 2002
- Dichelyne tornquisti Paschoal, Viera, Cezar & Luque, 2014
- Dichelyne travassosi Guimares & Cristófaro, 1974
- Dichelyne tripapillatus (Gendre, 1927)
