= Dichelyne alatae =

Scientific classification
- Domain: Eukaryota
- Kingdom: Animalia
- Phylum: Nematoda
- Class: Chromadorea
- Order: Rhabditida
- Family: Cucullanidae
- Genus: Dichelyne
- Species: D. alatae

Binomial name
- Dichelyne alatae De & Maity, 1995

Species of roundworm

Dichelyne alatae is a species of nematode, described on the basis of the worms recovered from the intestine of the whiting, Sillaginopsis panijus from the estuary of the Hooghly River at Kalyani, West Bengal, India. Dichelyne alatae is unique in having a small body size, deirids posterior to the oesophagus, short and wide caudal alae at the level of cloacal opening, unequal, alate spicules, a shield-shaped gubernaculum, a different number of caudal papillae and a conical tail with spines in its distal region.
