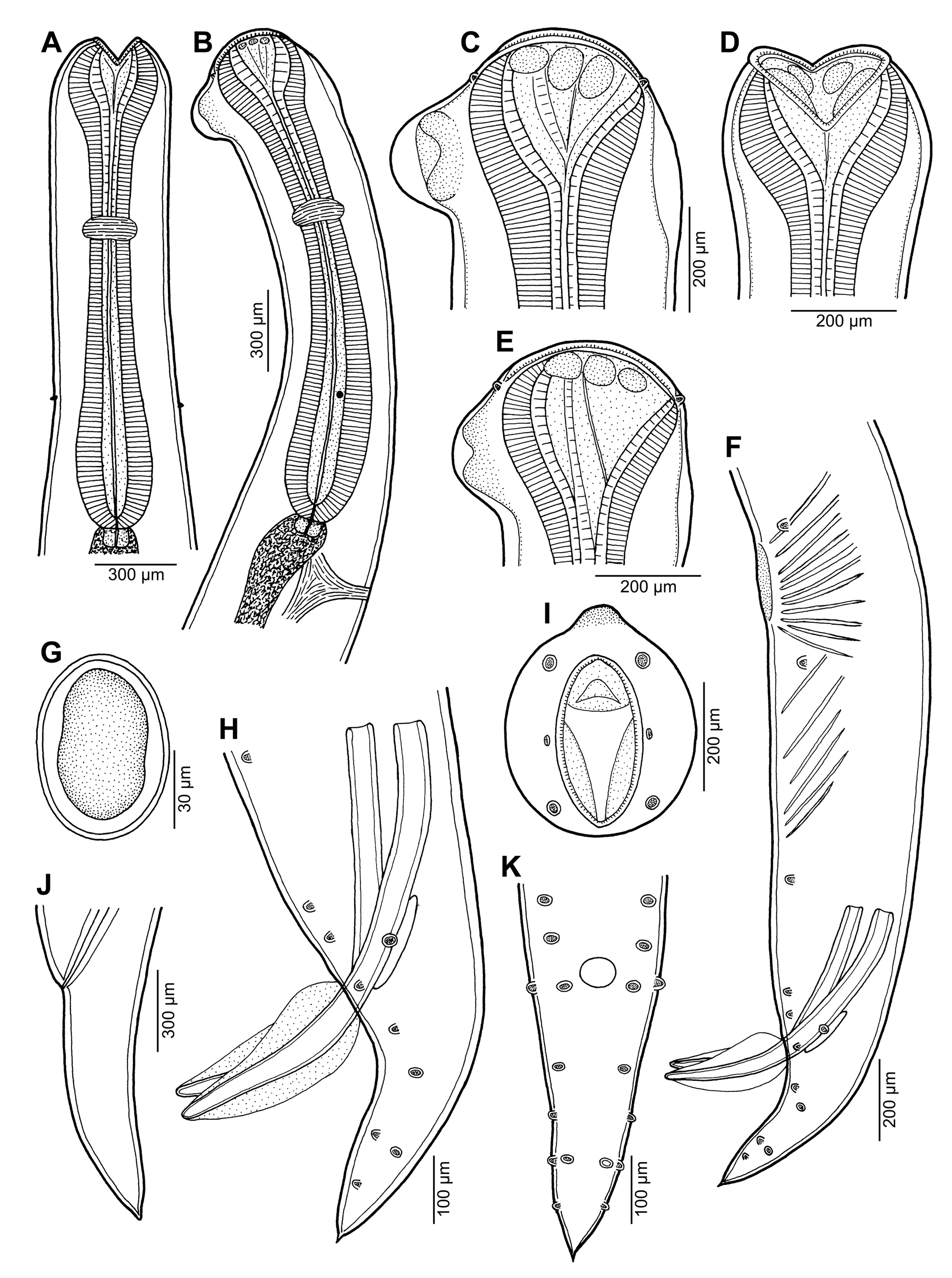
- Cucullanus bulbosus

Scientific classification
- Kingdom: Animalia
- Phylum: Nematoda
- Class: Chromadorea
- Order: Rhabditida
- Family: Cucullanidae
- Genus: Cucullanus; O.F. Müller, 1777

Species
- (among more than 100 species): Cucullanus acutospiculatus Moravec & Justine, 2020; Cucullanus austropacificus Moravec & Justine, 2018; Cucullanus bulbosus Lane, 1916; Cucullanus cirratus; Cucullanus diagrammae Moravec & Justine, 2020; Cucullanus elegans Zeder, 1800; Cucullanus epinepheli Moravec & Justine, 2017; Cucullanus gymnothoracis Moravec & Justine, 2018; Cucullanus hansoni Olsen; Cucullanus incognitus Moravec & Justine, 2018; Cucullanus longipapillatus Olsen; Cucullanus parapercidis Moravec & Justine, 2020; Cucullanus petterae Moravec & Justine, 2020; Cucullanus pybusae Pybus, 1978; Cucullanus robustus Yamaguti, 1935; Cucullanus stelmoides Pybus, 1978; Cucullanus variolae Moravec & Justine, 2020

Synonyms
- Truttaedacnitis Petter 1974

= Cucullanus =

Genus of roundworms

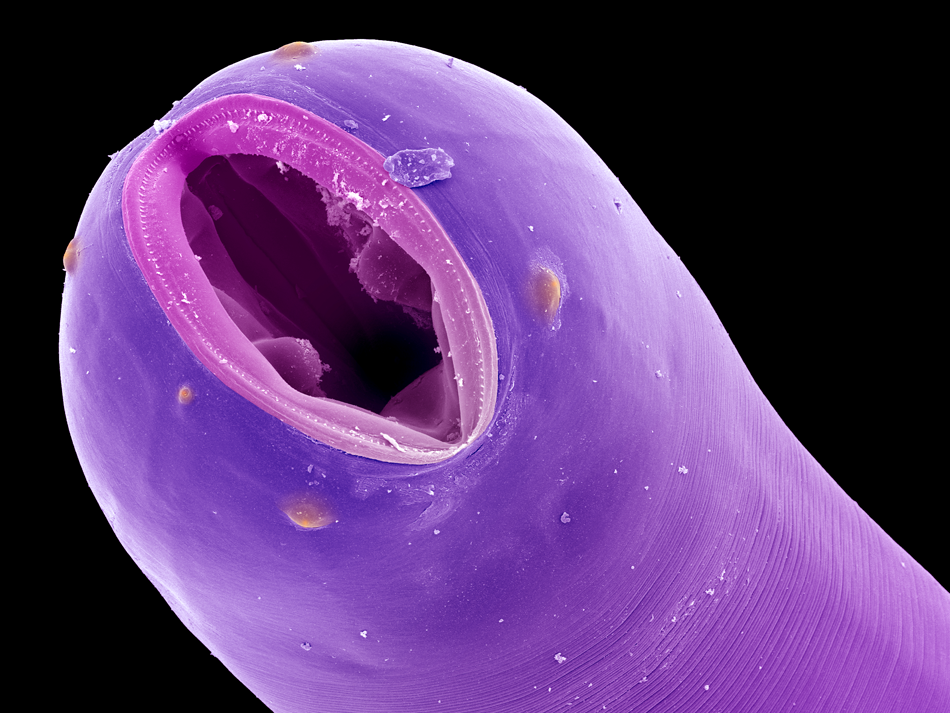
Cucullanus cirratus, scanning electron microscope photograph of the head (with added colours)

Cucullanus is a genus of parasitic nematodes. The genus includes more than 100 species.

Among the species, Cucullanus cirratus is a parasite of cod. Cucullanus genypteri is a parasite of the pink cusk-eel, Genypterus blacodes.

Two species known as C. pybusae and C. stelmoides were discovered in 1978 inhabiting the liver and intestines of the American brook lamprey.
