= Eduard Hisinger =

Finnish noble landowner, politician and botanist (1832-1904)

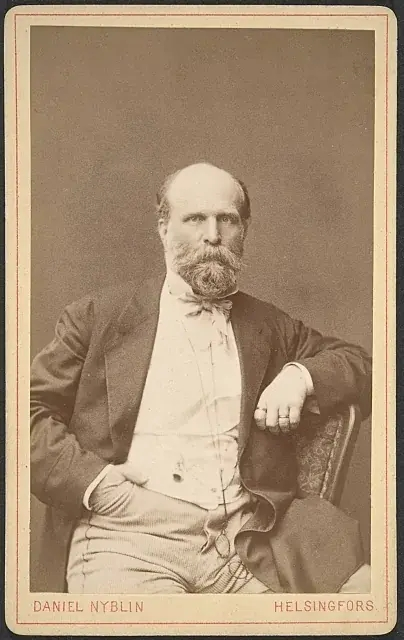
In 1883

Eduard Viktor Eugène Hisinger (July 16, 1832 – October 23, 1904) was a Finnish noble landowner, politician and botanist in Fagervik. He wrote a flora of Fagervik, as well as the first book on the edible mushrooms of Finland and promoted agriculture. He was also interested in insects and wrote on the dragonflies and orthoptera.

Hisinger was the son of Fagervik land owners Johan Fridolf Mikael Hisinger (1803–1883) and Alexandra Elisabet Bodisco. His family managed factories and farms in the region for a century. Their ancestor Johan Hisinger (1727–1790) who had established iron works in the area were also involved in establishing the chair of botany, first held by Johan Fredrik Wallenius at the Åbo Akademi. Hisinger took an interest in nature from an early age and was initially tutored at home and completed high school in 1850 and graduated in 1855 from the University of Helsinki with a degree in philosophy. He went to the University of Berlin in 1856 where he studied under Alexander Braun and Nathanael Pringsheim. He took over his family farms in Pohjan Brödtorp from 1858 and married Constance Johanna Ramsay (1837–1925), daughter of Anders Edvard Ramsay. In 1883 he moved to Fagervik after the death of his father. In 1860 he wrote a book on the edible mushrooms during a period of famine on the request of the Finnish Economic Society. He wrote two booklets on the insects of Finland, Finlands Orthopterer (1859) and Finlands Libellulider (1861). He published botanical notes in magazines and journals and supported the works of others. He donated 300 mk for a study of the algae by Count Harald Fredrik Georg Strömfelt (1861–1890) in 1882. He also supported an expedition into the Kola peninsula in 1887. He received an honorary doctorate from the University of Helsinki in 1882.

Hisinger was a member of the Societas pro Fauna et Flora Fennica, where he often attended meetings despite increasing deafness. He was a member of the Diet for 1863–64. His daughter Sylvia Margareta Vivika married the zoologist Axel Leonard Jägerskiöld.
