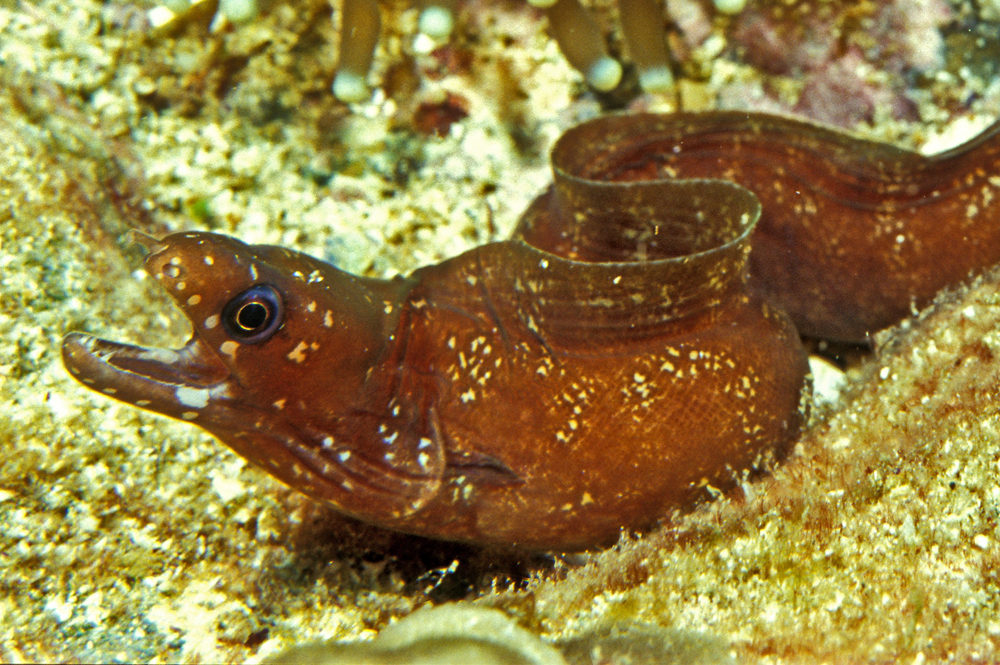
- A lipspot moray eel with the distinct white blotch on the lower lip near the corner of the mouth

Conservation status
- Least Concern (IUCN 3.1)

Scientific classification
- Kingdom: Animalia
- Phylum: Chordata
- Class: Actinopterygii
- Order: Anguilliformes
- Family: Muraenidae
- Genus: Gymnothorax
- Species: G. chilospilus

Binomial name
- Gymnothorax chilospilus Bleeker, 1864

= Lipspot moray eel =

Species of fish

The lipspot moray eel (Gymnothorax chilospilus), also known as the textile moray, white-lipped moray or white-lipped reef eel, is a moray eel found in coral reefs in the Pacific and Indian Oceans. It was first named by Pieter Bleeker in 1864.

It is named for a distinct white spot on the lower lip near the corner of the mouth.
