= Johan Fredrik Wallenius =

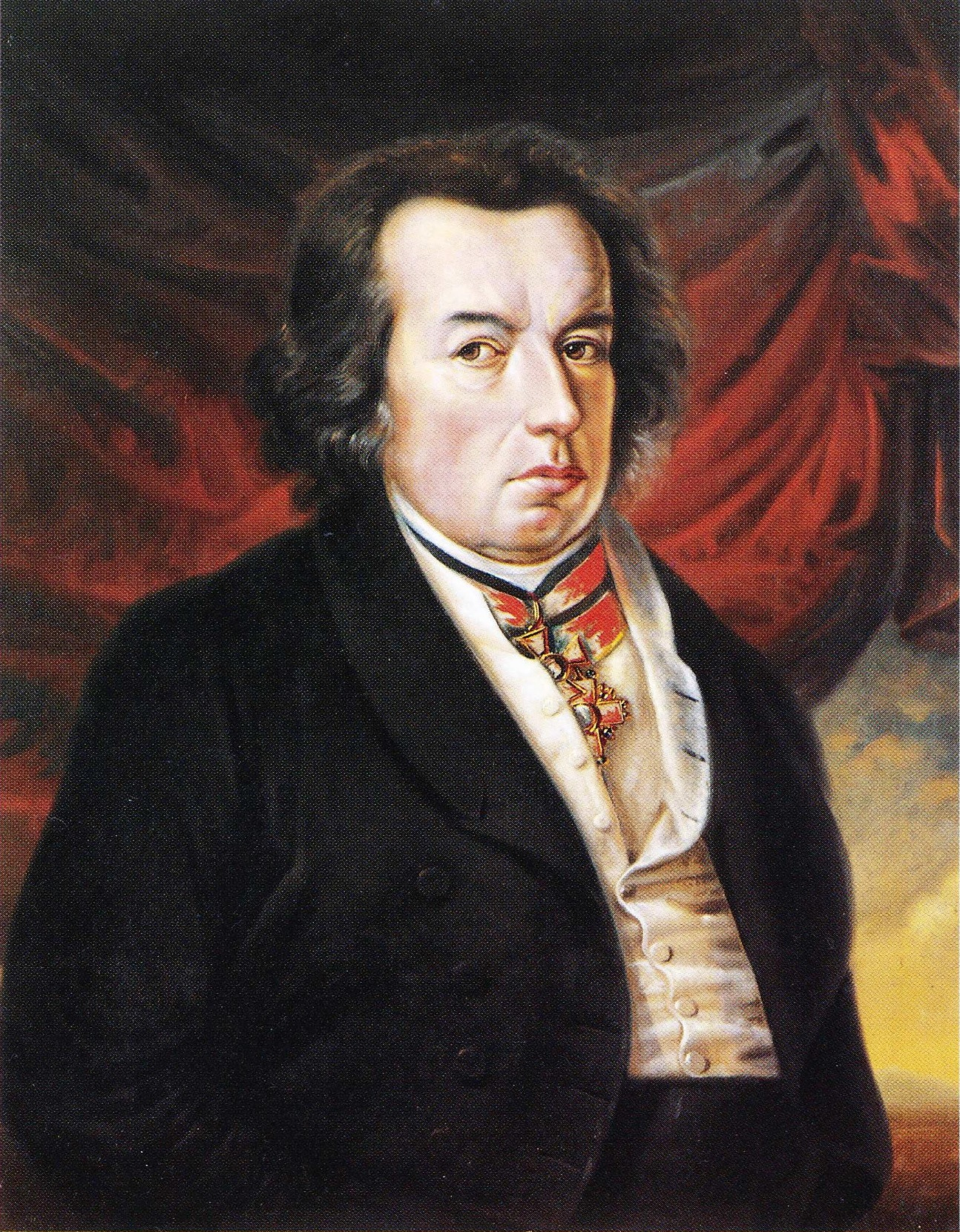
Wallenius in 1827

Johan Fredrik Wallenius (14 August 1765 – 12 January 1836) was a Finnish medical doctor and botanist.

Wallenius was born in Turku (Åbo) to mathematics professor Martin Johan and Renata Frosterus. He graduated from the Turku Secondary School. He studied medicine at Stockholm and received a medical license in 1785 under Johan Johansson Haartman (1725–1787). He wrote a thesis under Professor Carl Niclas Hellenius on supplementary plant foods for use during years when crops failed in 1782. He practiced medicine at Häme (1786–94) and then at Uusimaa (1794–1800). He became a demonstrator of botany at the Royal Academy of Turku in 1800–1805 after Anders Dahl (1751–1789) where he was to instruct students of medicine on medicinal plants. He later became a secretary of the Finnish Economy Society (Finska Hushållningssällskapet) from 1800 to 1805 and its chairman from 1812 to 1813. He supervised 50 doctoral students, including P. U. F. Sadelin Wallenius died in Turku from dropsy.
