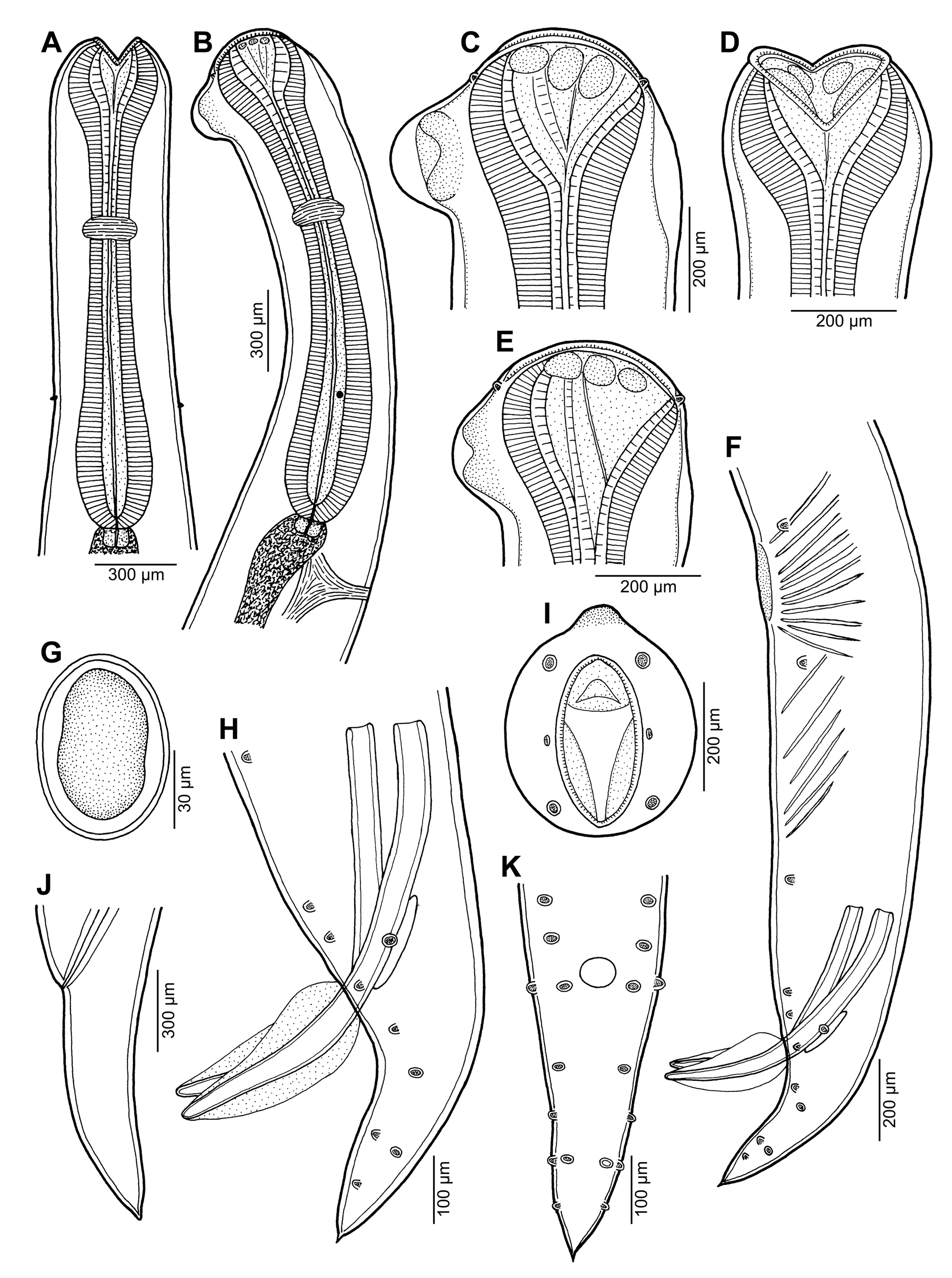

Scientific classification
- Kingdom: Animalia
- Phylum: Nematoda
- Class: Chromadorea
- Order: Rhabditida
- Family: Cucullanidae
- Genus: Cucullanus
- Species: C. bulbosus

Binomial name
- Cucullanus bulbosus (Lane, 1916) Barreto, 1918

Synonyms
- Bulbodacnitis bulbosa Lane, 1916

= Cucullanus bulbosus =

Species of roundworm

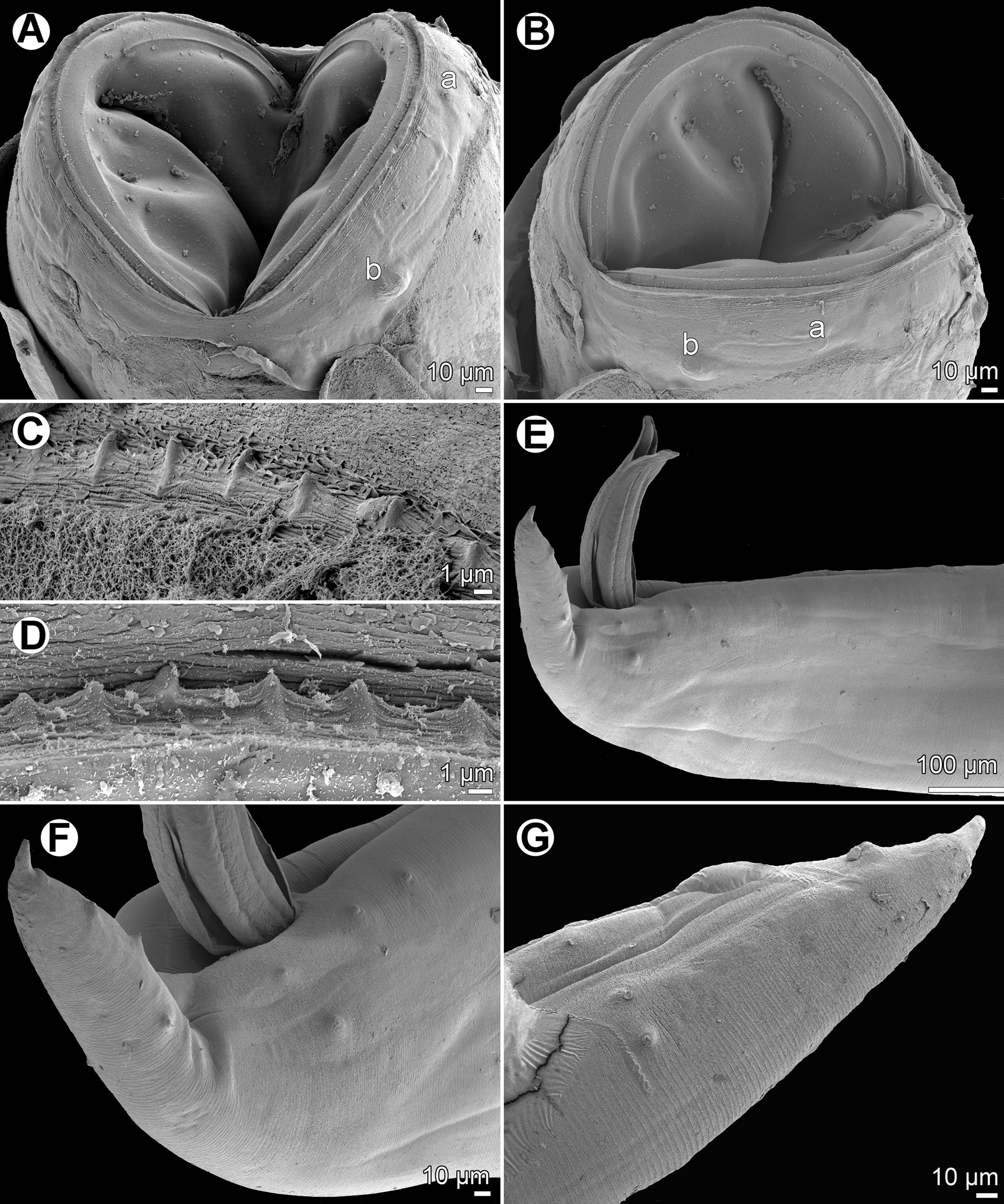
Cucullanus bulbosus, scanning electron microscopy

Cucullanus bulbosus is a species of parasitic nematodes. It is an endoparasite of carangid fishes.

In 1916, Lane described a new cucullanid species, Bulbodacnitis bulbosa, from the bluefin trevally Caranx melampygus off Sri Lanka and established the new genus Bulbodacnitis to accommodate it, because he considered the presence of a dorsal hemispherical cephalic elevation in this species to be of generic importance. However, Barreto considered Bulbodacnitis Lane, 1916 a junior synonym of Cucullanus O.F. Müller, 1777, to which he transferred Lane’s species.

Cucullanus bulbosus had not been recorded since its description by Lane in 1916, but it was found again only in 2016, one century after, from specimens collected in Carangoides fulvoguttatus off New Caledonia. The 2016 study included the first scanning electron microscopy examination and confirmed some previously reported morphological features in this species, showed some new characters (presence of circumoral spines and ventral oblique muscle bands in the male) and provided observations of the cephalic structures and male caudal papillae.
