= Axel Leonard Jägerskiöld =

Finnish-born Swedish zoologist

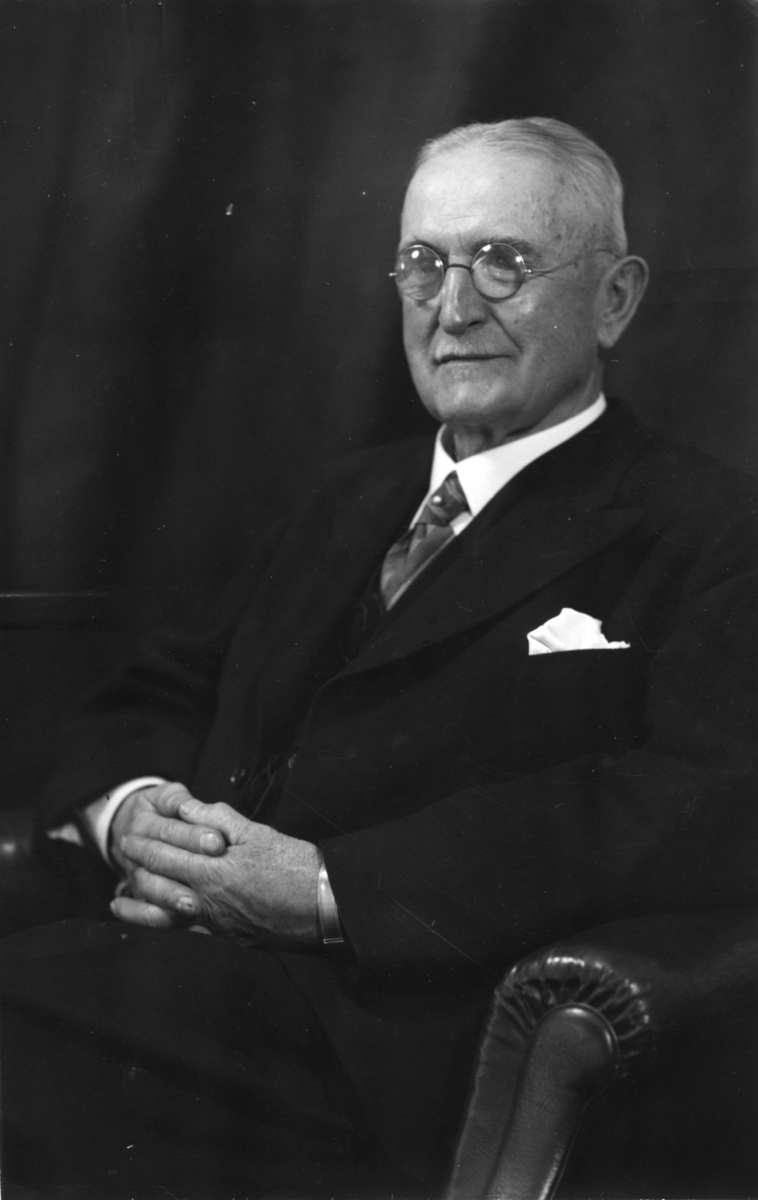
c. 1942

Axel Krister Edward Leonard Jägerskiöld (November 12, 1867 – August 4, 1945) was a Finnish-born Swedish zoologist. He collected specimens across Scandinavia despite problems in vision and hearing and was a curator at the Gothenburg museum. His early work was on nematodes but later worked on birds and marine biology.

== Life and work ==
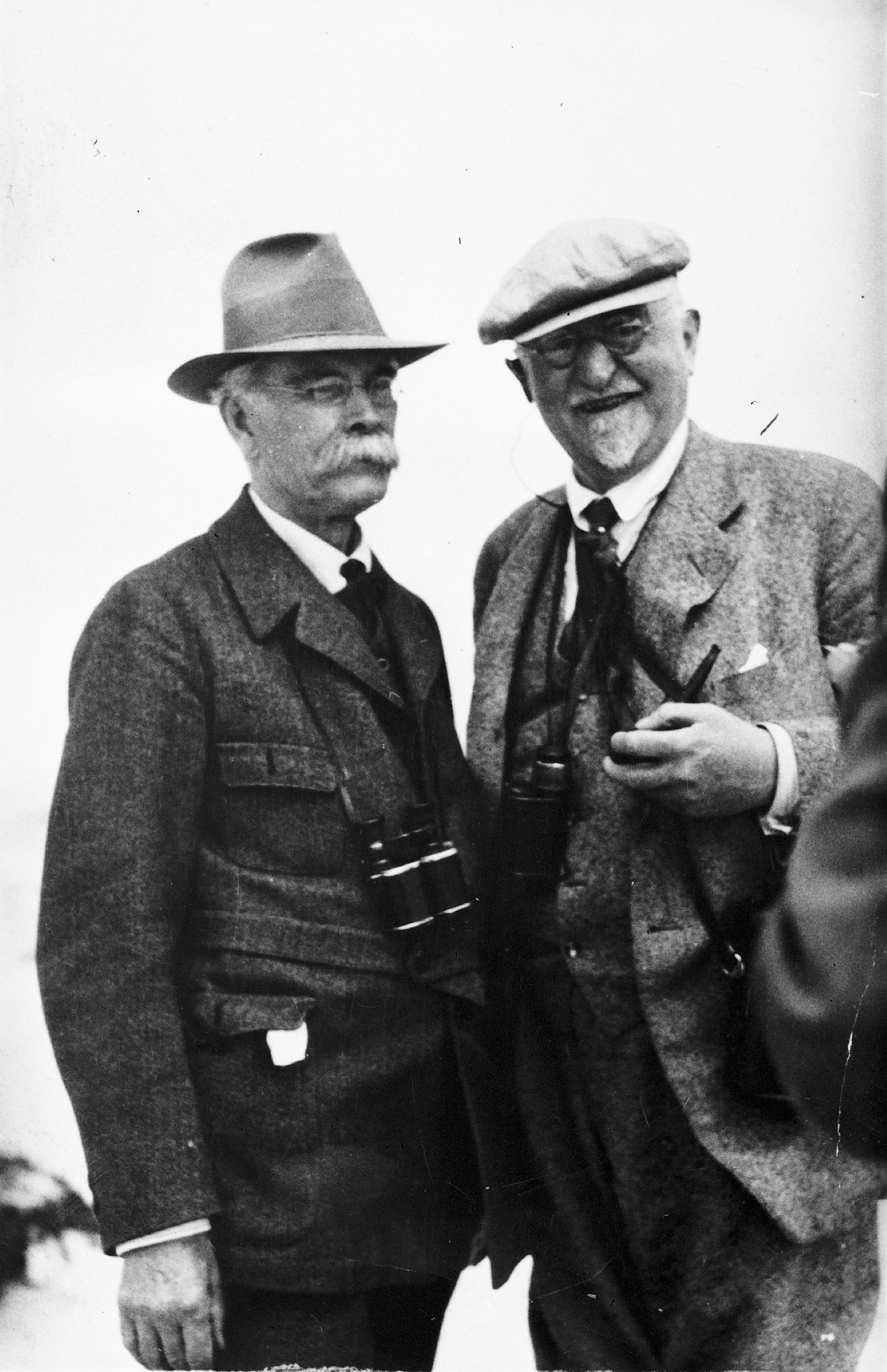
With Paul Rosenius (left)

Jägerskiöld was born on Mejlan estate in Finland, Nyland county where his father Gustaf Magnus Leonard (1831–71) was a captain in the Russian navy. After the death of his father, he moved to Stockholm when his mother Johanna Vilhelmina Augusta married her cousin A. H. Ramsay. Baron Gustaf Mannerheim was a distant cousin. He studied at Stockholm and because of poor health, outdoor activities were recommended. He became interested in hunting, sailing and long walks where he was inspired to study nature by his teacher Alexander Skånberg and his cousin professor Christian Loven. He moved to Uppsala with his mother who was widowed again and joined the University of Uppsala in 1887. He studied Romance languages and zoology, choosing the latter thanks to encouragement from Tycho Tullberg. He became a Swedish citizen in 1890. He received a doctorate in 1893 and continued to study parasitic roundworms until 1909 and had to move away from working with the microscope due to eye problems. His interested in the outdoors made him move to study vertebrates and in collaboration with Gustav Kolthoff (1895-99) he worked on the birds and published an illustrated book on the birds of the north (Nordens fåglar) from 1895 to 1899. This was so successful that it went into a second edition from 1911 to 1926. He was given the title of professor in 1912. He made many collecting trips into the Finnmark and Lapland, writing popular articles for the press. In 1894 he visited Rudolf Leuckart's laboratory in Leipzig. In 1900-01 he led a Swedish expedition to north Africa and the Middle East. A career as a lecturer was ruled out by deafness that worsened since the age of 20. In 1904 he accepted a position of curator at the Gothenburg museum. In 1911 he promoted bird ringing and was involved in the conservation of fossil strata at Uddevalla. From 1922 to 1939 he studied marine biology, making collections around the North Sea. In 1941 he settled in Djursholm but continued to work at Gothenburg.

Jägerskiöld married Finnish baroness Sylvia Margaretha Vivika Hisinger (1872-1958), daughter of Eduard Hisinger, in 1891 and they had two sons. Jägerskiöld was killed when he was hit by a train near Väröbacka while walking on the tracks after a hunting expedition. He was buried in the Örgryte cemetery.
