= František Moravec (parasitologist) =

Czech parasitologist (born 1939)

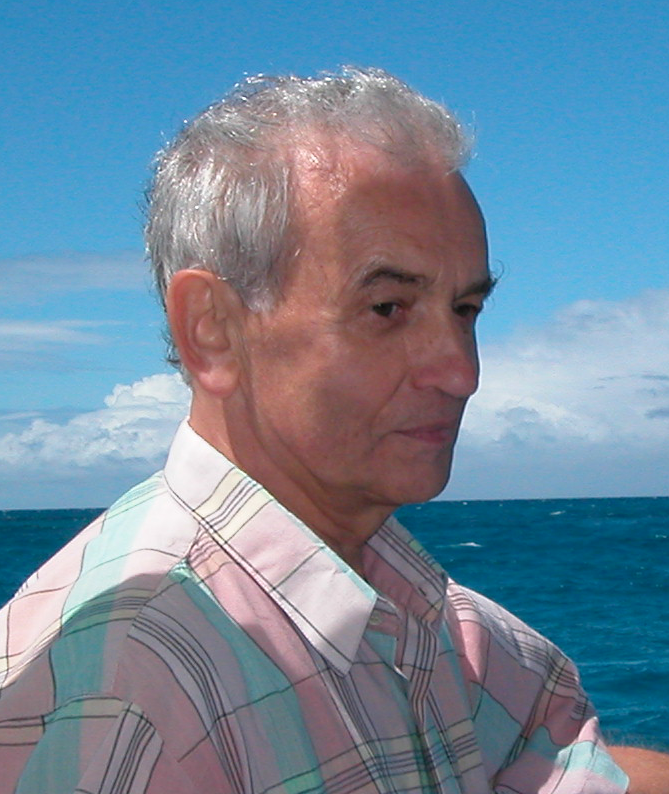
- Moravec in 2004
- Born: 1 January 1939 (age 87); Velká Bystřice, Czechoslovakia
- Citizenship: Czech Republic
- Education: Masaryk University
- Known for: parasitology, Nematoda
- Scientific career
- Fields: Parasitology
- Workplaces: Institute of Parasitology in České Budějovice
- Author abbrev. (zoology): Moravec

František Moravec (born 1 January 1939) is a Czech parasitologist who specialises on the Nematodes, especially the nematodes parasites of fishes. His research is mainly in the field of taxonomy of the Nematoda.

== Education and career ==
Moravec was born on 1 January 1939 in Velká Bystřice, Czechoslovakia. He was in high school in Olomouc then was a student in the Masaryk University in Brno. For his Masters in 1962, he studied the parasitic worms of reptiles of Czechoslovakia. After graduation, he worked at the Institute of Parasitology of the Czech Academy of Sciences in České Budějovice, and in 1970 completed his thesis on nematodes parasites in fish. He is a world authority on Nematodes, especially their systematics and biology.

== Research ==
Among the most important works by Moravec, Tomáš Scholz mentions his revision of the genera Rhabdochona and Anguillicola, and also his clarification of the family Capillariidae, for which he proposed to split the old "catch-all" genus Capillaria in 14 genera. In 2001, Moravec proposed a new revision of the Capillariidae, with 22 genera. In 1994, Moravec published a 500-page book, Parasitic nematodes of freshwater fishes of Europe, which was considered a major contribution to the study of fish parasites.

In 1996, Scholz reported that Moravec had already published nearly 270 papers — the number is now higher than 350, including eleven books. Moravec is a member of the Editorial Board of several international journals such as Folia Parasitologica, Helminthologia, Acta Societatis Zoologicae Bohemicae, Acta Parasitologica and Parasite.

== Eponymous taxa ==
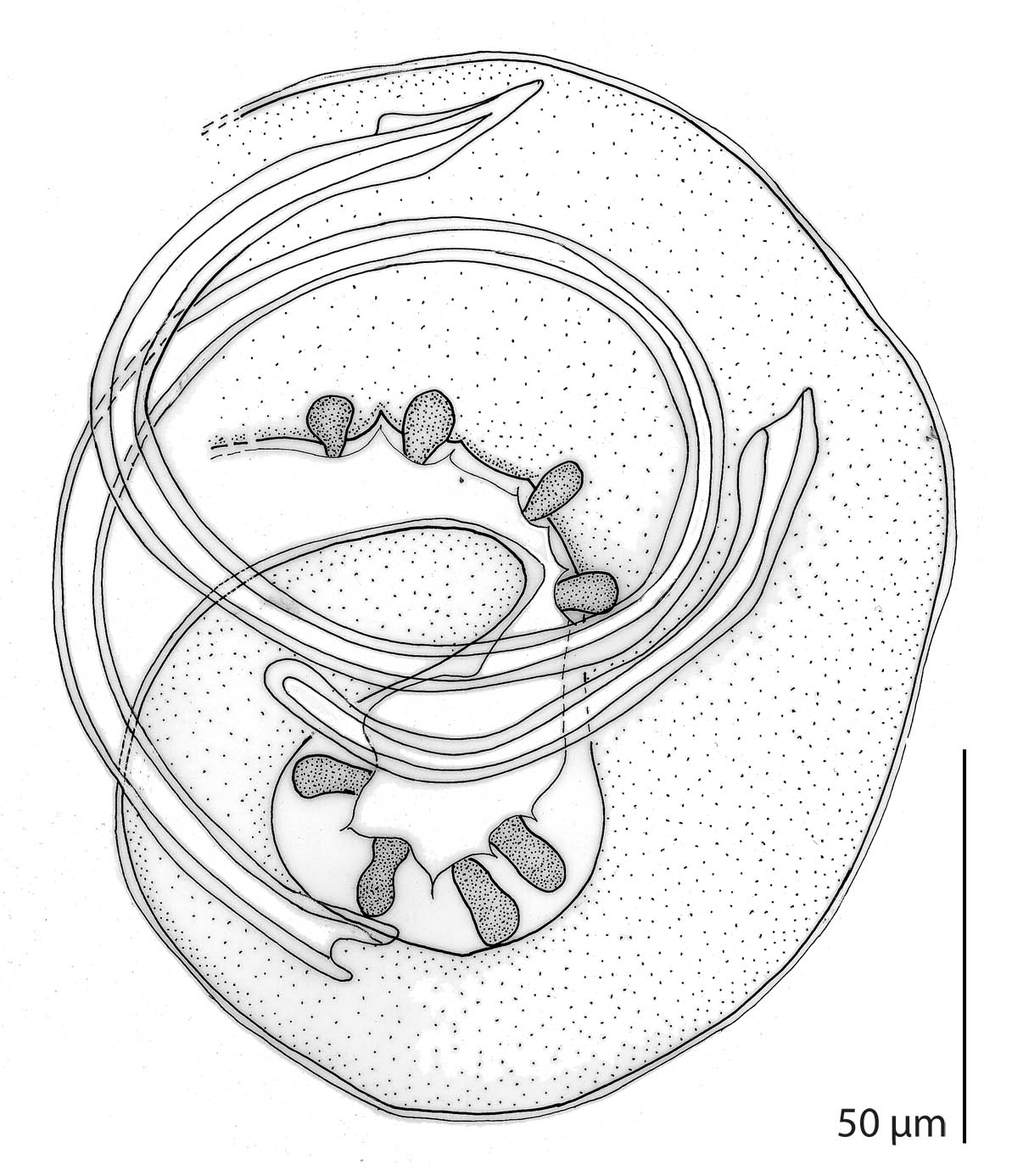
Moravecnema segonzaci, a nematode species which honours František Moravec

Many taxa of parasites have been named in the honour of František Moravec by parasitologists from various countries, such as two genera of nematodes, Moravecia Ribu & Lester, 2004 and Moravecnema Justine, Cassone & Petter, 2002 and many species of Nematodes such as Aonchotheca moraveci Esteban, Mas-Coma, Oltra-Ferrero & Botella, 1991, Camallanus moraveci Petter, Cassone & France, 1974, Dichelyne moraveci Petter, 1995, Freitascapillaria moraveci Caspeta-Mandujano, Salgado-Maldonado & Vazquez, 2009, Huffmanela moraveci Carballo & Navone, 2007, Oswaldocruzia moraveci Ben Slimane & Durette-Desset, 1995, Philometroides moraveci Vismanis & Yunchis, 1994, Pseudocapillaria moraveci Iglesias, Centeno, Garcia & Garcia-Estevez, 2013, Pterothominx moraveci Baruš, Kajerová & Koubková, 2005, Royandersonia moraveci (Anderson & Lim, 1996) Moravec & Van As, 2004, Spinitectus moraveci Boomker & Puylaert, 1994, Goezia moraveci De & Dey, 1992, Moaciria moraveci Bursey, Goldberg & Kraus, 2007 and Raphidascaroides moraveci Pereira, Tavares, Scholz & Luque, 2015, and also species of Monogenea such as Gyrodactylus moraveci Ergens, 1979 andKritskyia moraveci Kohn, 1990 and of Digenea such as Homalometron moraveci Bray, Justine & Cribb, 2007

== Drawings of parasites by František Moravec ==
As a specialist of the taxonomy of parasitic worms, Moravec has drawn a large number of species. The gallery shows just a few of these.

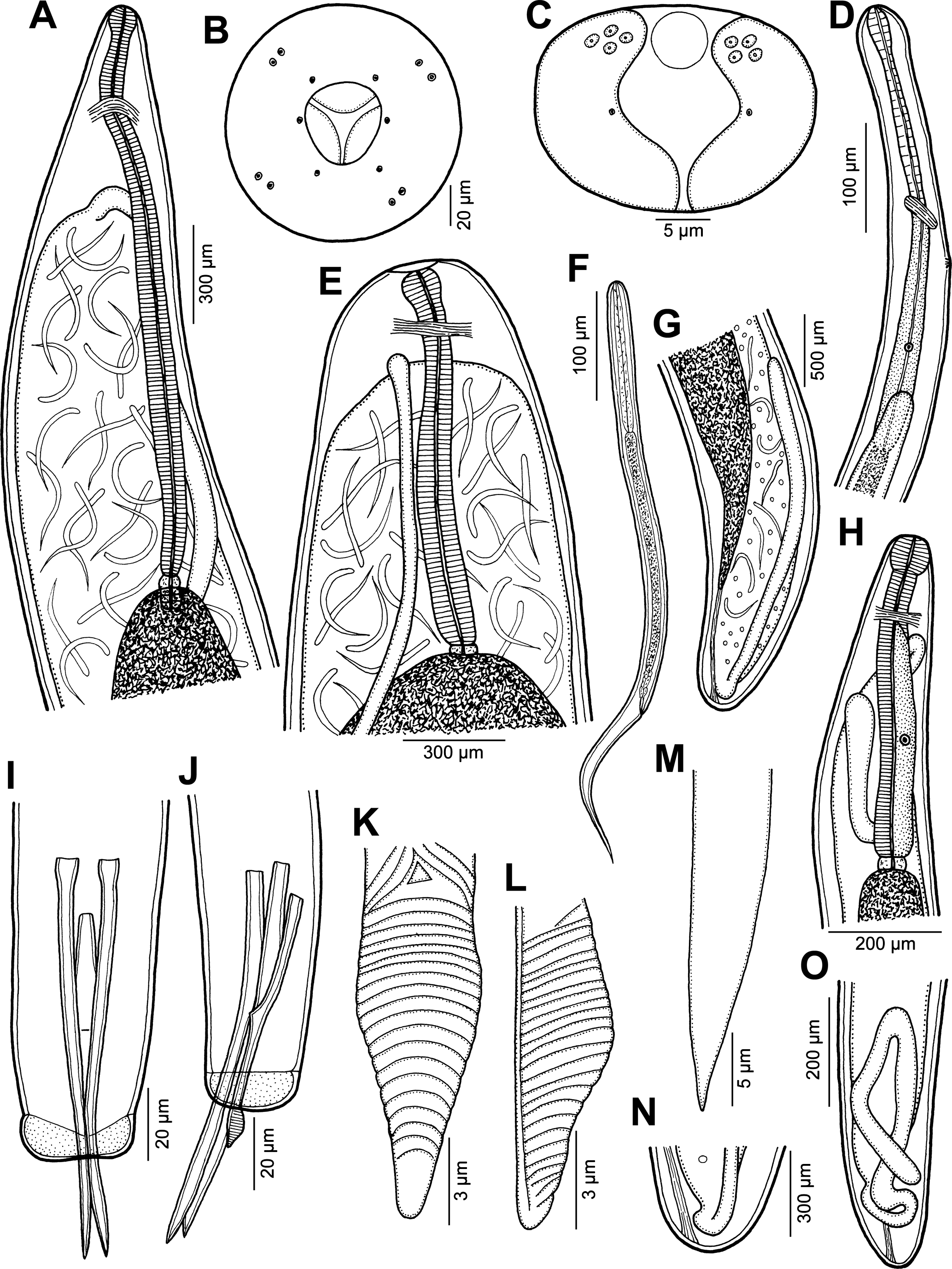
Philometra protonibeae (Nematoda, Philometridae)

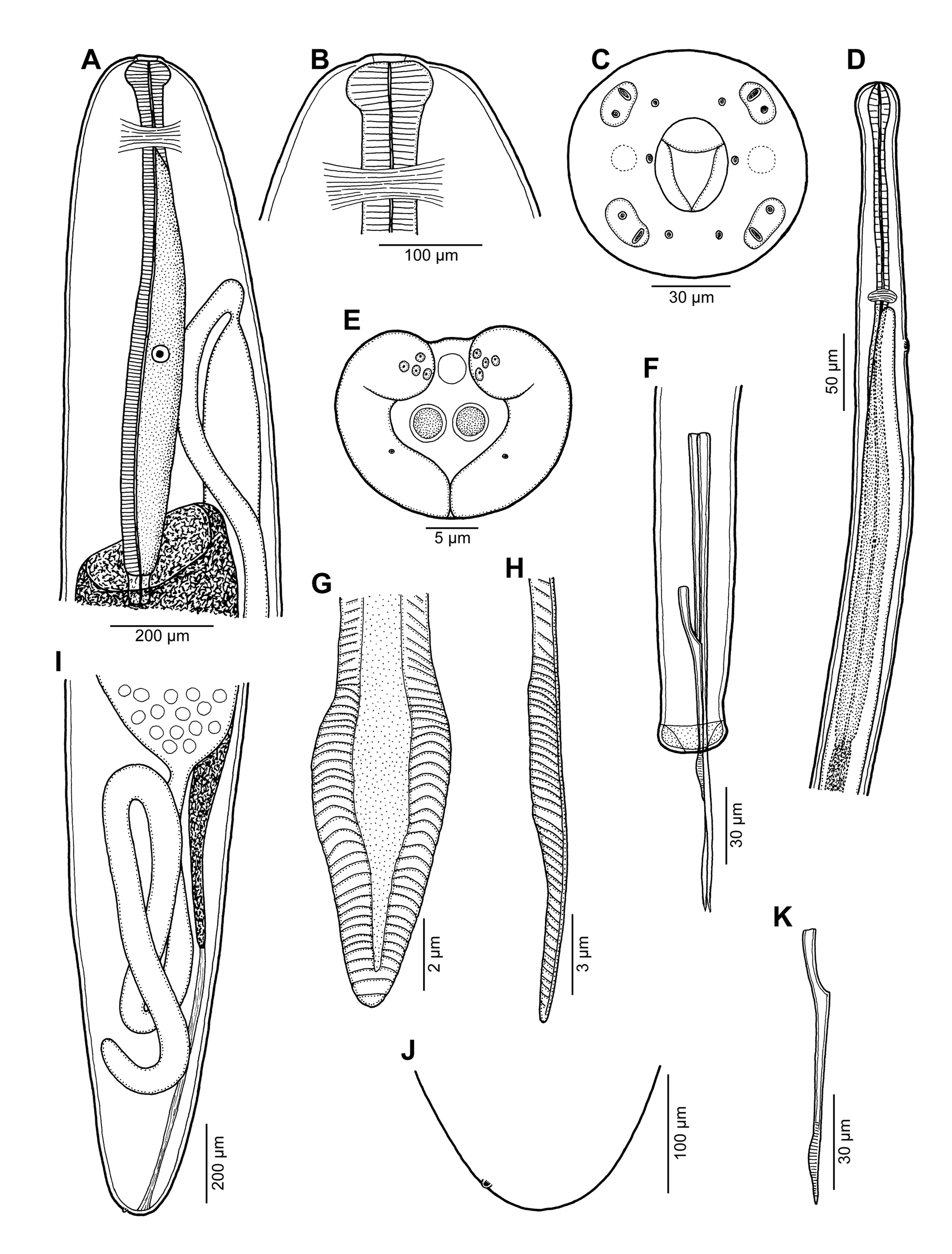
Philometra rara (Nematoda, Philometridae)

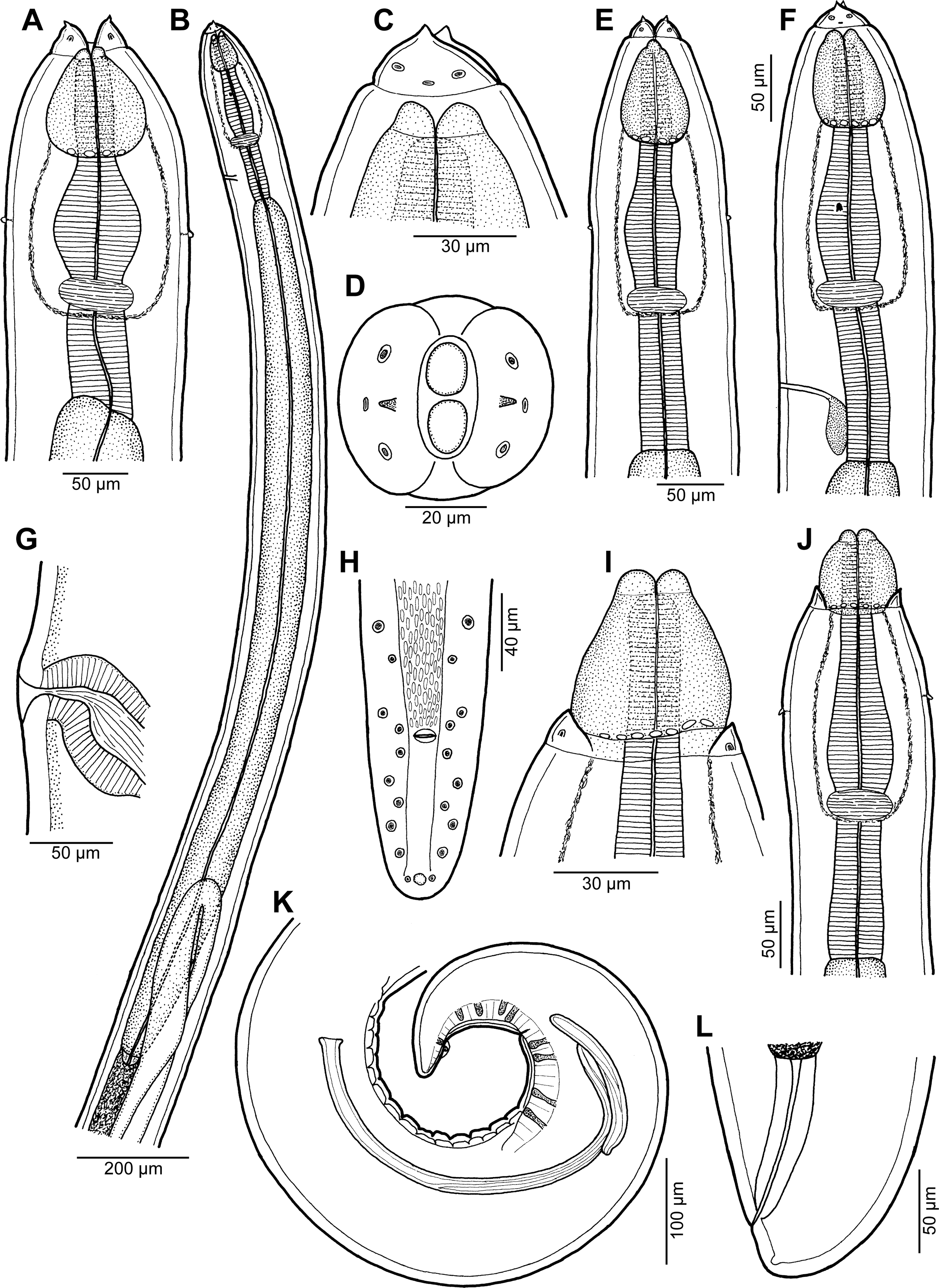
Rasheedia heptacanthi (Nematoda, Physalopteridae)

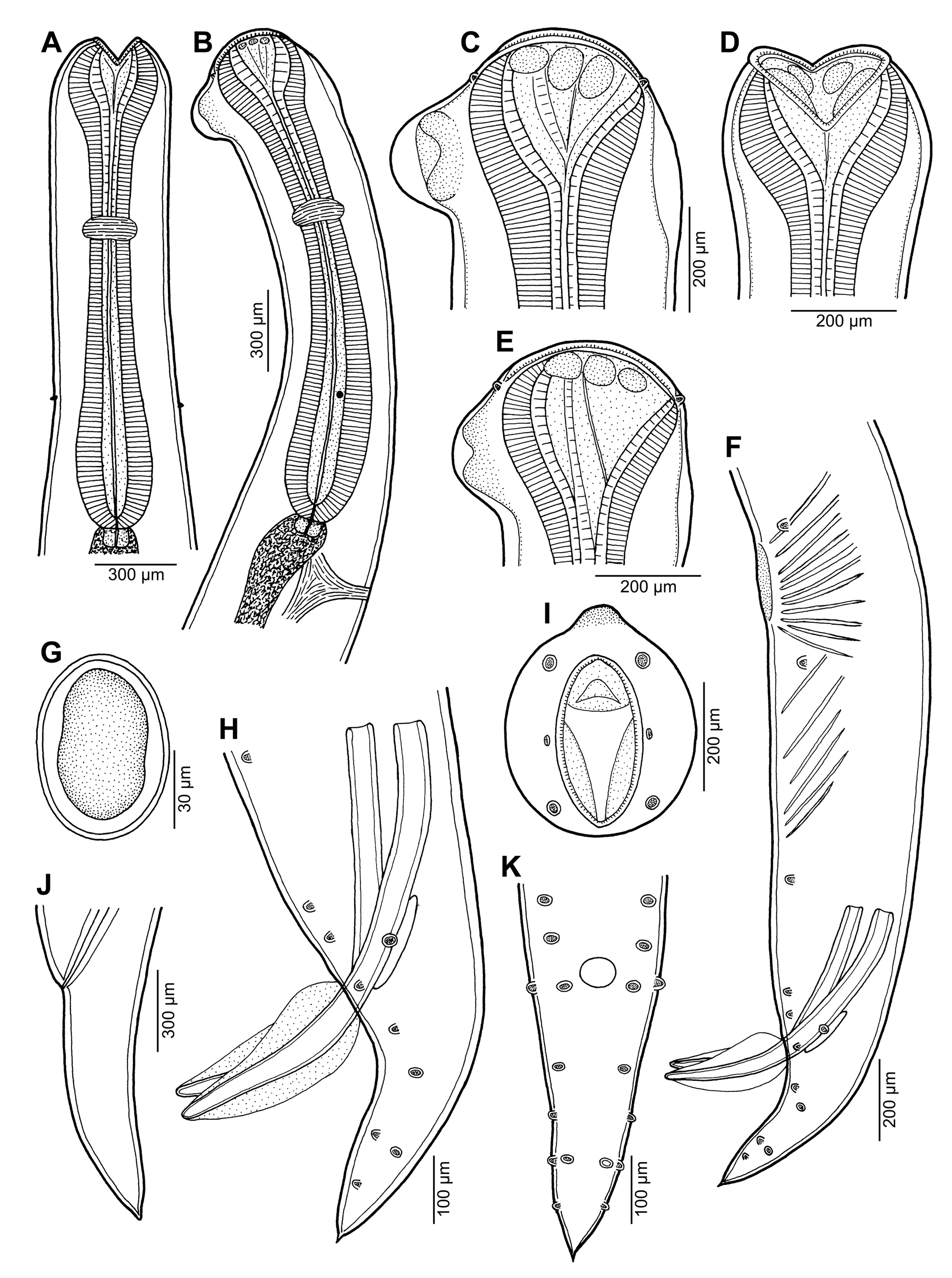
Cucullanus bulbosus (Nematoda, Cucullanidae)

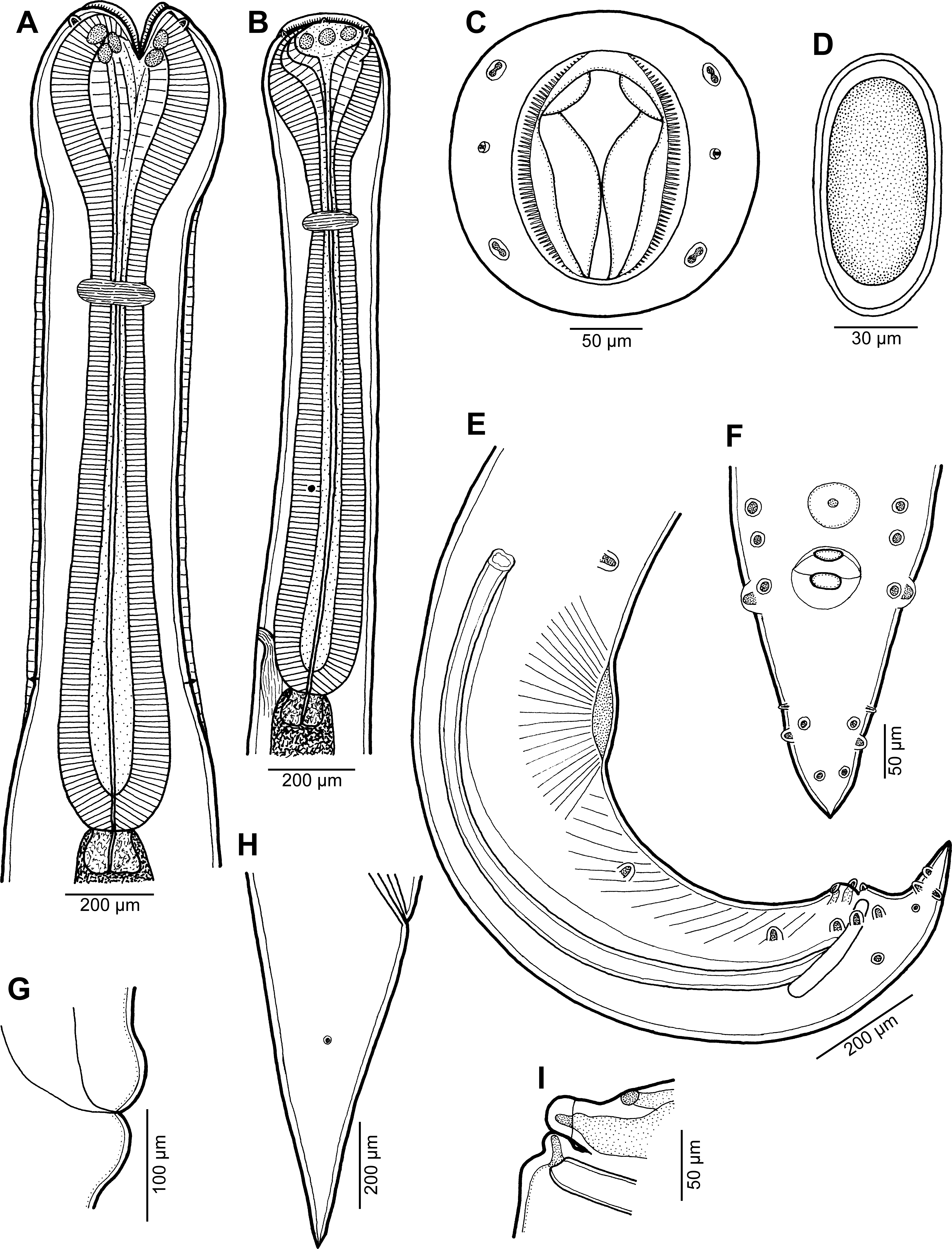
Cucullanus austropacificus (Nematoda, Cucullanidae)
