= František Moravec =

Czech military officer (1895–1966)

Brigadier General František Moravec CBE
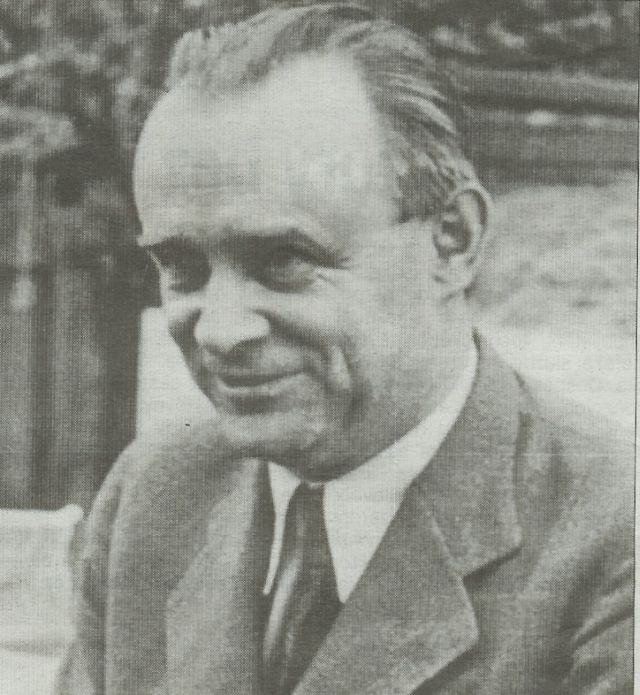
- Moravec in 1952
- Born: 23 July 1895; Čáslav, Austria-Hungary
- Died: 26 July 1966 (aged 71); Washington, D.C., United States
- Occupation: Intelligence officer
- Espionage activity
- Allegiance: Czechoslovakia
- Service branch: Military Intelligence
- Operations: First World War; Second World War; Cold War

František Moravec CBE (23 July 1895 – 26 July 1966) was the chief Czechoslovak military intelligence officer before and during World War II. He moved to the United States after the war.

== Biography ==
=== World War I ===
In 1914, Moravec was drafted into the Austro-Hungarian Army and sent to the Eastern Front, into Galicia. In September 1914, he fought at the Battle of Rawa. On 13 January 1915, Moravec was taken as prisoner by Russian troops and sent to the POW camp in Tsaritsyn. In 1916, he joined the Serbian Legion and fought in the Romanian Front, was moved from Arkhangelsk to the United Kingdom, and in 1917 joined the Czechoslovak Legions at the Salonica front. In January 1918, the legions were sent to the Western Front in France and in the summer of 1918, to the Italian Front.

=== Interwar years ===
After World War I, Moravec was sent to Slovakia to fight against the Hungarian and the Slovak Soviet Republic. After 1919, Moravec served as an army officer in Plzeň and in 1928 he joined the military intelligence service and moved to Prague.

From 1937 to 1938, Moravec was deputy head of the service and head of its operations department. In January 1939, he became the acting head of the service.

=== World War II ===
On the evening of 14 March 1939, he and 10 of his fellow intelligence officers secretly managed to fly away with the most valuable intelligence files and archives from Prague Ruzyně Airport to London Croydon Airport, with a stopover in Rotterdam on an ad hoc chartered KLM Douglas DC-3, as they knew in advance from their secret agents operating in Nazi Germany that the invasion leading to the German occupation of Czechoslovakia was to be on 15 March 1939 at 06:00. Rescued files and archives were handed over to the MI6 to be used against Germany.

In Great Britain from 1940 to 1945, Moravec served as the chief of the intelligence service of the Czechoslovak government-in-exile. The military intelligence headquarters were in Porchester Gate in London, but from 1940 his private residence was in Addington, Buckinghamshire, near Aston Abbotts, where the exiled President of Czechoslovakia Edvard Beneš had his residence.

From 1939 to 1942, Moravec maintained secret radio contact with the Czech anti-Nazi resistance group known as Three Kings group. He supervised Czechoslovak cooperation with the Special Operations Executive (SOE) and participated in the planning and preparation of Operation Anthropoid, which resulted in the assassination of senior SS official Reinhard Heydrich. He also planned the assassination of Emanuel Moravec, a traitor and Nazi collaborator who was known as the "Czech Quisling".

=== Later life ===
František Moravec returned to Czechoslovakia in 1945 after the defeat of Nazi Germany but left secretly again in 1948, shortly after the communist coup d'état. He settled in the United States, where he worked until his death as an intelligence advisor in the US Department of Defense.

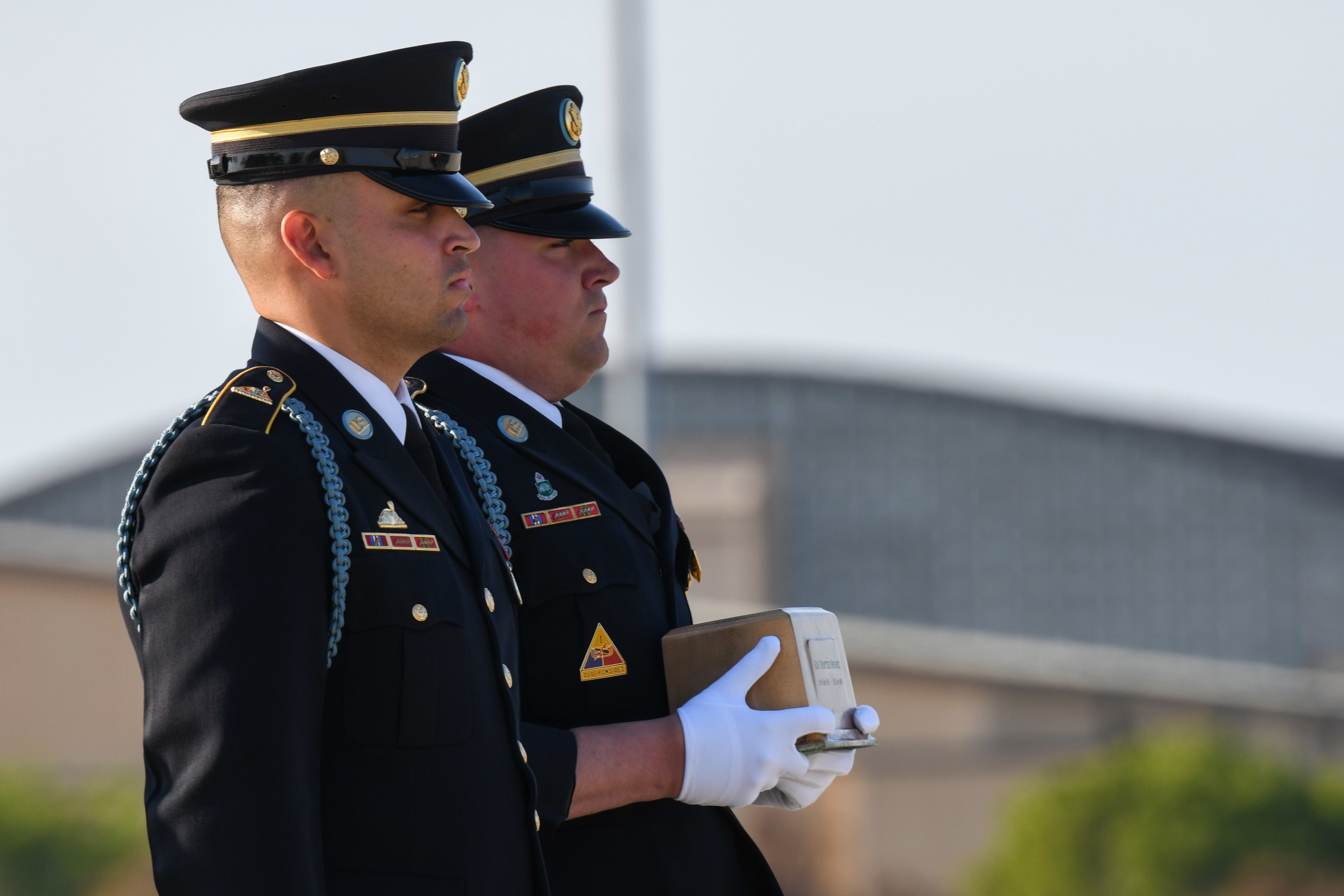
The Old Guard Casket Team holds the remains of Moravec during his dignified transfer, April 2022.

Moravec died on July 26, 1966 in Washington, D.C. On April 24, 2022, the dignified transfer of Moravec's remains from the United States to the Czech Republic took place at Joint Base Andrews.

== Decorations ==
Awarded by the Czech Republic

- Order of the White Lion military group II. Class (2024)

== Works ==
- František Moravec (autobiography): Master of Spies, 1975, ISBN 0-370-10353-X.

== See also ==
- Czech resistance to Nazi occupation
- Occupation of Czechoslovakia
- Operation Anthropoid
- 601st Special Forces Group
