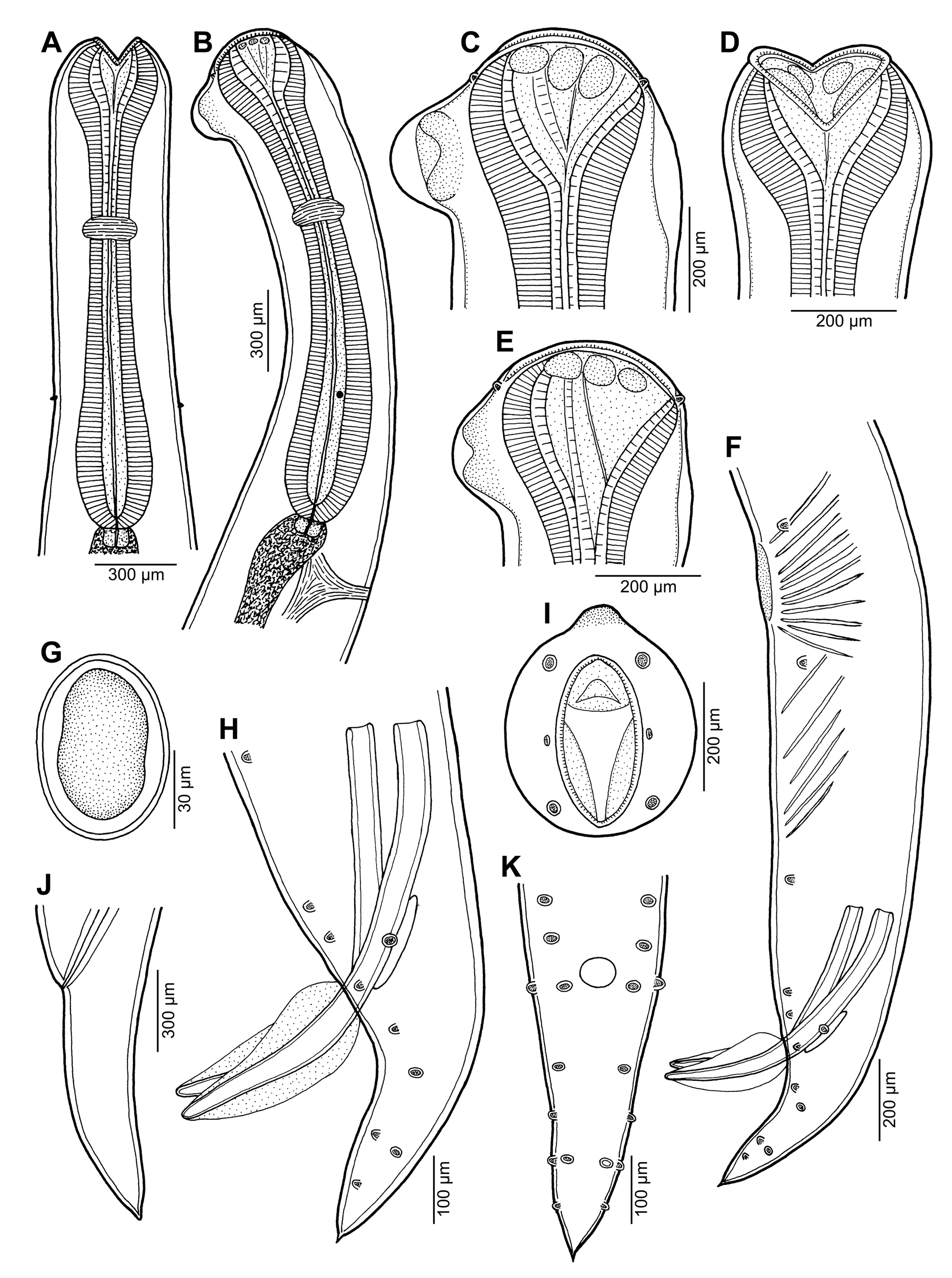
- Cucullanus bulbosus

Scientific classification
- Kingdom: Animalia
- Phylum: Nematoda
- Class: Chromadorea
- Order: Rhabditida
- Suborder: Spirurina
- Infraorder: Ascaridomorpha
- Superfamily: Seuratoidea
- Family: Cucullanidae; Cobbold, 1864

= Cucullanidae =

Family of roundworms

Cucullanidae is a family of parasitic nematodes, created by Cobbold in 1864. It includes the following genera:

- Cucullanus Müller, 1777
- Dichelyne Jägerskiöld, 1902
- Neocucullanus Travassos, Artigas & Pereira, 1928
