= Chloropterus =

Scientific classification
- Kingdom: Animalia
- Phylum: Arthropoda
- Clade: Pancrustacea
- Class: Insecta
- Order: Coleoptera
- Suborder: Polyphaga
- Infraorder: Cucujiformia
- Family: Chrysomelidae
- Subfamily: Eumolpinae
- Tribe: Typophorini
- Genus: Chloropterus; Morawitz, 1861

Type species
- Heterocnemis versicolor Morawitz, 1860

Synonyms
- Heterocnemis Morawitz, 1860 (nec Albers, 1852); Nodostoma Jacquelin du Val, 1868

Genus of leaf beetles

Chloropterus is a genus of leaf beetles in the subfamily Eumolpinae. It is distributed in Eastern Europe, West to Central Asia and North Africa.

The genus was originally established under the name Heterocnemis by the Russian entomologist Ferdinand Morawitz in 1860 for a single species, Heterocnemis versicolor. However, the name Heterocnemis had already been used for a genus of flower chafers (Cetoniinae), so Morawitz renamed his genus to Chloropterus the following year.

== Species ==
- Chloropterus bimaculatus (Raffray, 1873) – Algeria, Morocco
- Chloropterus fiorii Ruffo, 1965 – Libya
- Chloropterus grandis Weise, 1889 – Kyrgyzstan, Kazakhstan, Mongolia, China (Xinjiang), Tajikistan, Turkmenistan, Uzbekistan, Russia (west Siberia)
- Chloropterus inornatus (Chen, 1935) – China (Xinjiang)
- Chloropterus lefevrei Reitter, 1890
  - Chloropterus lefevrei arabicus Lopatin, 2008 – United Arab Emirates
  - Chloropterus lefevrei lefevrei Reitter, 1890 – Azerbaijan, Iran, Iraq, Kazakhstan, Oman, Saudi Arabia, Tajikistan, Turkmenistan, Uzbekistan
- Chloropterus mateui (Selman, 1969) – Algeria
- Chloropterus moldaviensis Pic, 1909 – Romania
- Chloropterus ornatus Lopatin, 1984 – Iran, Iraq
- Chloropterus pallidus Chobaut, 1898 – Algeria
- Chloropterus persicus (Baly, 1878) – Iran
- Chloropterus politus Berti & Rapilly, 1973 – Iran, Oman
- Chloropterus stigmaticollis Fairmaire, 1875 – Tunisia
- Chloropterus unguiculatus Lopatin, 1977 – Tajikistan
- Chloropterus versicolor (Morawitz, 1860) – Ukraine, southern European Russia, Turkey, Azerbaijan, Kazakhstan, Turkmenistan
