= Dracunculus =

Dracunculus may refer to:

- Dracunculus (plant), a genus of plants in the family Araceae
- Dracunculus (nematode), a genus of nematodes in the family Dracunculidae
