= Dracunculiasis =

Infection by the Guinea worm

- Other names: Guinea-worm disease; dracontiasis
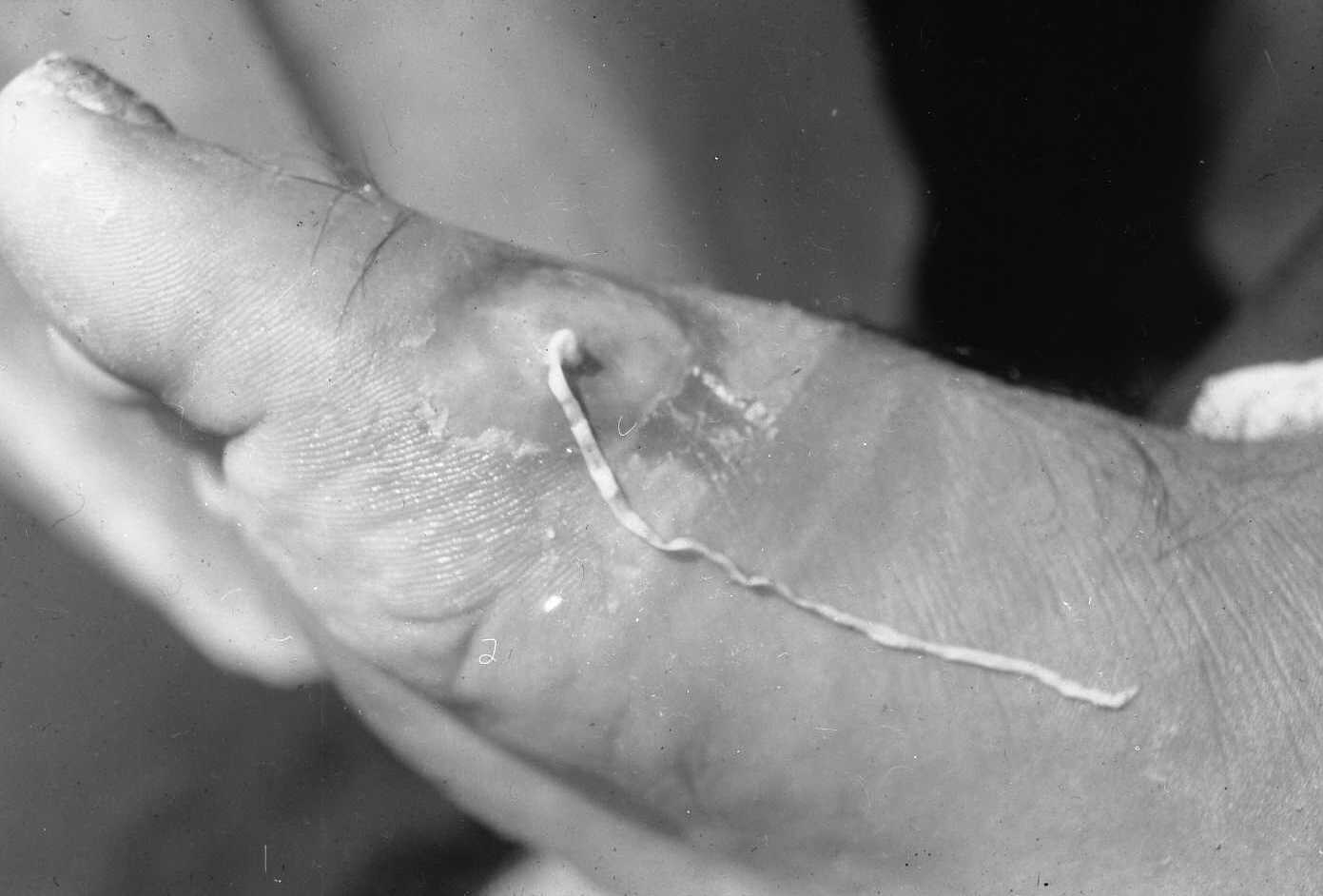
- D. medinensis worm emerging from a wound on a person's foot
- Specialty: Infectious disease
- Symptoms: Painful blister that a long white worm crawls out of
- Usual onset: One year after exposure
- Causes: Ingesting Guinea worm–infected copepods, drinking contaminated water
- Prevention: Preventing those infected from putting the wound in drinking water, treating contaminated water
- Treatment: Slowly extracting worm, supportive care
- Frequency: 10–15 cases worldwide per year (2022–2025)
- Deaths: ~1% of cases

Dracunculiasis, also called Guinea-worm disease, is a parasitic disease caused by the Guinea worm (Dracunculus medinensis). A person becomes infected by drinking water contaminated with larvae that reside inside copepods (a type of small crustacean). Stomach acid digests the copepod and releases the larva, which penetrates the gastrointestinal tract and escapes into the body. Around a year later, the adult female worm migrates to an exit site — usually the lower leg — and induces an intensely painful blister on the skin. Eventually, the blister bursts, creating a painful wound from which the worm gradually emerges over several weeks. The wound remains painful throughout the worm's emergence, disabling the affected person for the three to ten weeks it takes the worm to emerge. The female worm releases larvae when the host submerges the wound in water in attempts to relieve the pain, thus continuing the life cycle.

There is no medication to treat or prevent dracunculiasis. Instead, the mainstay of treatment is the careful wrapping of the emerging worm around a small stick or gauz to encourage and speed up its exit. Each day, a few more centimeters of the worm emerge, and the stick is turned to maintain gentle tension. Too much tension can break and kill the worm in the wound, causing severe pain and swelling. Dracunculiasis is a disease of extreme poverty, occurring in places with poor access to clean drinking water. Prevention efforts center on filtering drinking water to remove copepods as well as public education campaigns to discourage people from soaking affected limbs in sources of drinking water, as this action allows the worms to spread their larvae.

Accounts consistent with dracunculiasis appear in surviving documents from physicians of Greco-Roman antiquity. In the 19th and early 20th centuries, dracunculiasis was widespread across much of Africa and South Asia, affecting as many as 48 million people per year. The effort to eradicate dracunculiasis began in the 1980s following the successful eradication of smallpox in 1977. By 1995, nearly every country with endemic dracunculiasis had established a national eradication program. In the ensuing years, dracunculiasis cases have dropped precipitously, falling below 100,000 cases per year in 1997, below 10,000 cases in 2007, below 1,000 cases in 2012, below 100 cases in 2015, and to only 10 cases in 2025. Since 1986, 16 previously endemic countries have eradicated dracunculiasis, leaving the disease primarily endemic in three landlocked developing countries of central Africa – Chad, Ethiopia and South Sudan. Three additional countries remain to be certified as free of dracunculiasis transmission that have had no reported human cases since the end of 2023: Angola, Mali, and Sudan. One of these, Sudan, is pre-certified but not yet confirmed free of transmissions. Additionally, although Cameroon has been certified free of internal transmission since 2007, it has experienced three cases since 2019 along its border with Chad. D. medinensis can also infect dogs, cats, and baboons, though non-human cases are also falling due to the eradication efforts. Other Dracunculus species cause dracunculiasis in reptiles worldwide and in mammals in the Americas.

In 2020, the World Health Organization set 2027 as its target date for eradication of dracunculiasis. If the eradication program succeeds, dracunculiasis is expected to become the second human disease to be eradicated, after smallpox.

== Signs and symptoms ==
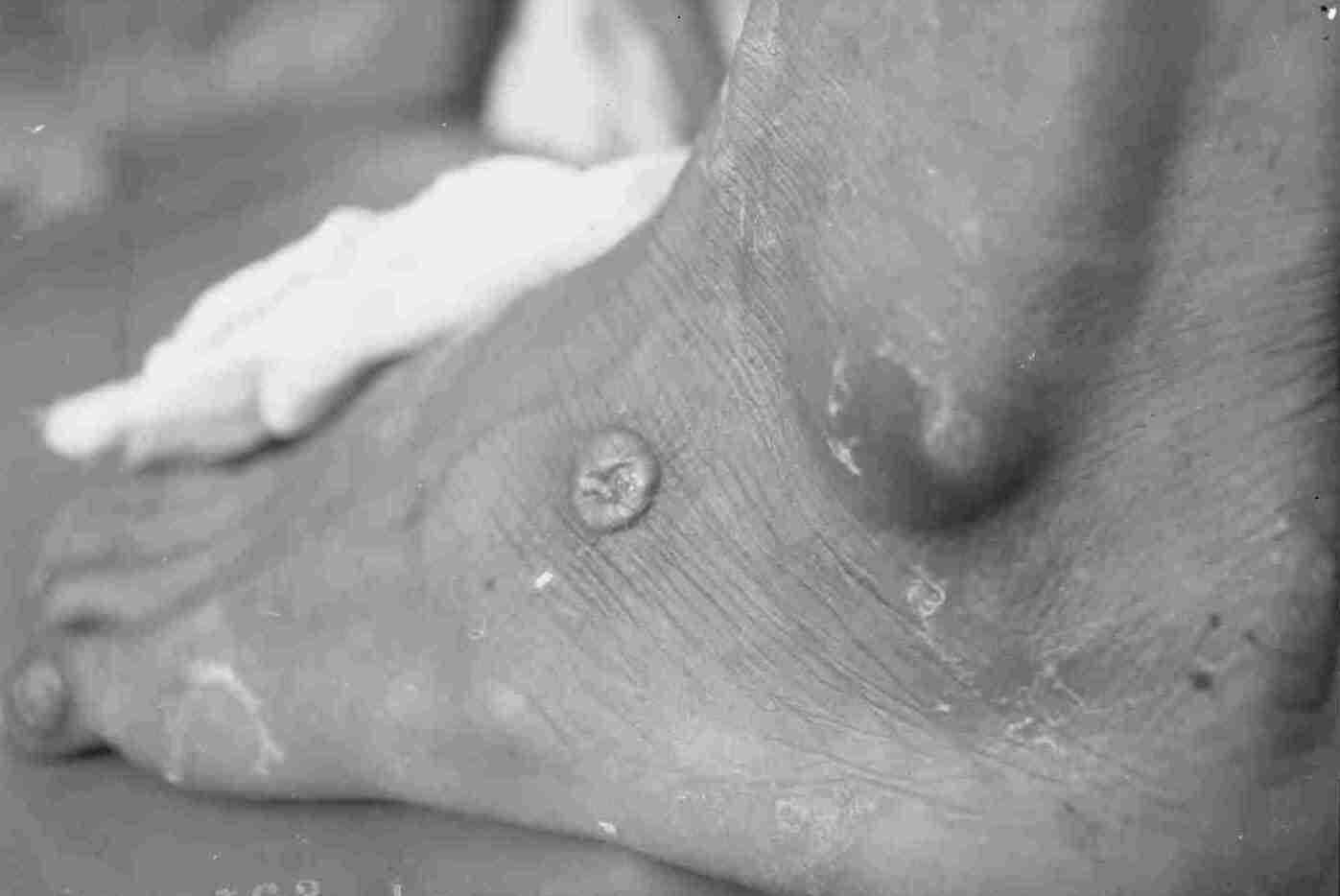
Blister on the foot of a person with dracunculiasis

The first signs of dracunculiasis occur around a year after infection, as the full-grown female worm prepares to leave the infected person's body. As the worm migrates to its exit site – typically the lower leg – some people have allergic reactions, including hives, fever, dizziness, nausea, vomiting, and diarrhea. Upon reaching its destination, the worm forms a fluid-filled blister under the skin. Over 1–3 days, the blister grows larger, begins to cause severe burning pain, and eventually bursts, leaving a small open wound. The wound remains intensely painful as the worm slowly emerges over several weeks to months.

If an affected person submerges the wound in water, the worm spews a white substance, releasing its larvae into the water. Over the lengthy period during which the worm emerges, the open blister often becomes infected with bacteria, resulting in redness and swelling, abscesses, or, in severe cases, gangrene, sepsis, or tetanus. When the secondary infection is near a joint (typically the ankle), the damage to the joint can result in stiffness, arthritis, or contractures.

Infected people commonly harbor multiple worms – on average 1.8 worms per person (that is, a distribution of 9 worms per 5 infected persons), but as many as 40 – which will emerge from separate blisters at the same time. Ninety percent of worms emerge from the legs or feet. However, worms can emerge from anywhere on the body.

== Cause ==
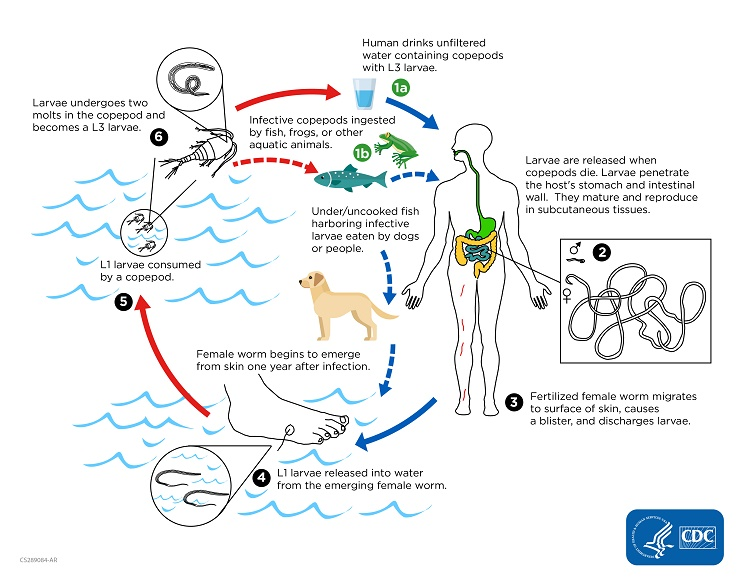
Life cycle of Dracunculus medinensis

Dracunculiasis is caused by infection with the roundworm Dracunculus medinensis. D. medinensis larvae reside within small aquatic crustaceans called copepods. Humans typically get infected when they unintentionally ingest copepods while drinking water. In some cases, infected copepods are consumed by fish or frogs, which are then consumed by humans or other animals, passing along the D. medinensis larvae. During digestion the copepods die, releasing the D. medinensis larvae. The larvae exit the digestive tract by penetrating the stomach and intestine, taking refuge in the abdomen or retroperitoneal space (behind the organs near the back of the abdomen). Over the next two to three months the larvae develop into adult male and female worms. The male remains smaller at 4 cm (1.6 in) long and 0.4 mm (0.016 in) wide; the female is comparatively large, often over 100 cm (39 in) long and 1.5 mm (0.059 in) wide. Once the worms reach their adult size inside the human body, they mate and the male dies. Over the ensuing months, the female migrates to connective tissue or along bones, and continues to develop with her embryos.

About a year after the initial infection, the pregnant female migrates to the skin, typically in the host's lower leg or foot, forms an ulcer, and emerges. When the wound touches fresh water, the female spews a milky-white substance containing hundreds of thousands of larvae into the water. Over the next several days as the female emerges from the wound, it can continue to discharge larvae into the surrounding water. The larvae are eaten by copepods, and after two to three weeks of development, they are infectious to humans again.

== Diagnosis ==
Dracunculiasis is diagnosed by visual examination – the thin white worm emerging from the blister is unique to this disease. Dead worms sometimes calcify and can be seen in the subcutaneous tissue by X-ray. Patients usually report a history of drinking contaminated water from stagnant sources. Recent developments have enhanced the early and non-invasive identification of Dracunculus medinensis using two methods. The first method involves polymerase chain reaction (PCR) techniques, specifically the qPCR protocol, targeting the mitochondrial cytochrome b (cytb) gene of Guinea worm. The second method utilizes immunological tests, where antigen detection assays or serological tests have been developed to recognize specific markers linked to the parasite. This testing could potentially detect prepatent infections up to six months before the worms appear, making it practically significant.

== Prevention ==
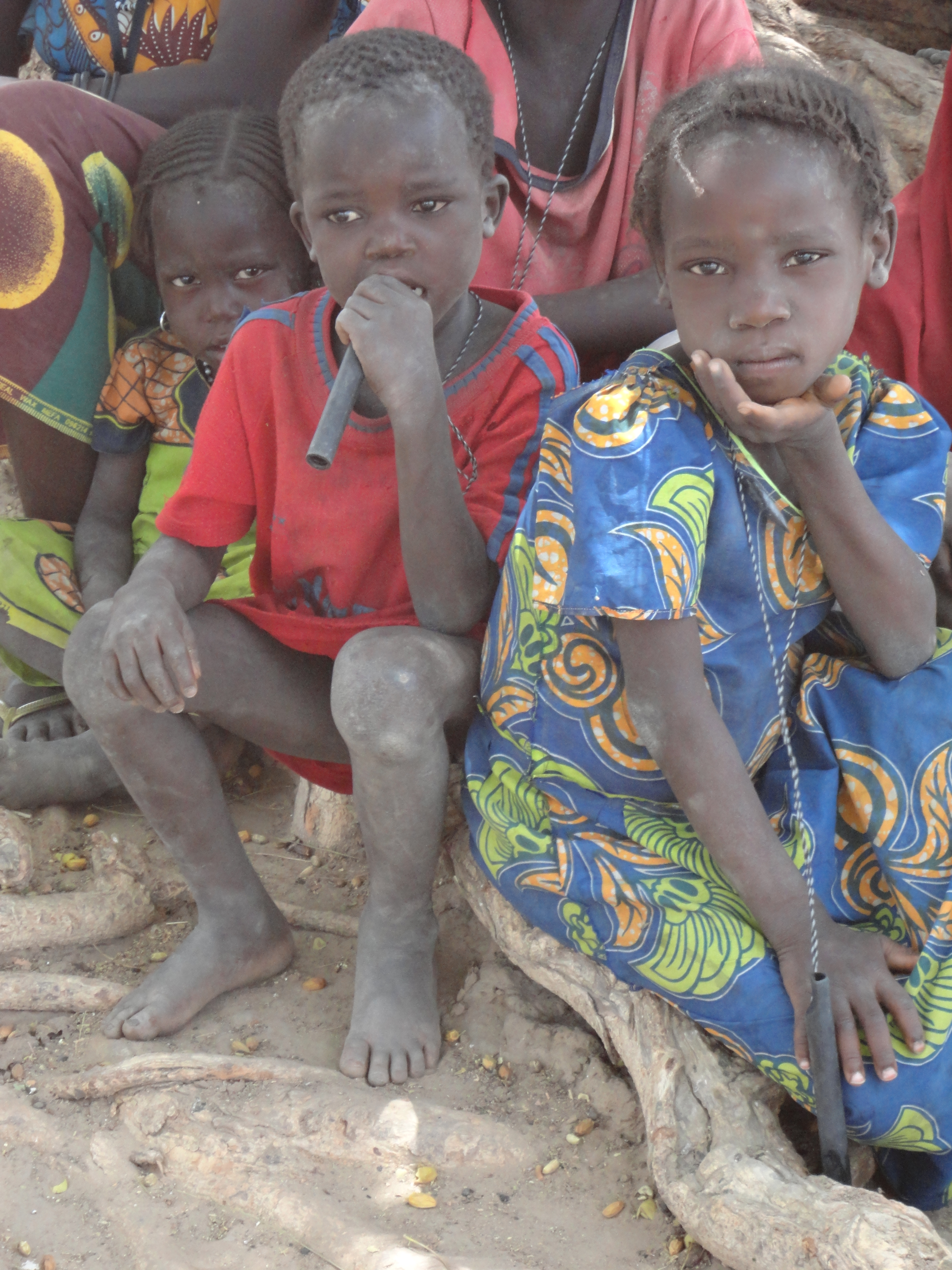
Children in Chad holding filter straws used to prevent D. medinensis infection

There is no vaccine for dracunculiasis, and once infected with D. medinensis there is no way to prevent the disease from running its full course. Consequently, efforts to reduce the burden of dracunculiasis focus on interrupting the reproduction cycle of D. medinensis via water supplies. A mainstay of eradication efforts is the improvement of drinking water. Nylon filters, finely woven cloth, or specialized filter straws can all remove copepods from drinking water, eliminating transmission risk. Water sources can also be treated with the larvicide compound temephos, which kills copepods, and contaminated water can be treated by boiling. Where possible, open sources of drinking water are replaced by deep wells that can serve as sources of clean water. Public education campaigns inform people in affected areas how dracunculiasis spreads and encourage those with the disease to avoid soaking their wounds in bodies of water that are used for drinking.

== Treatment ==
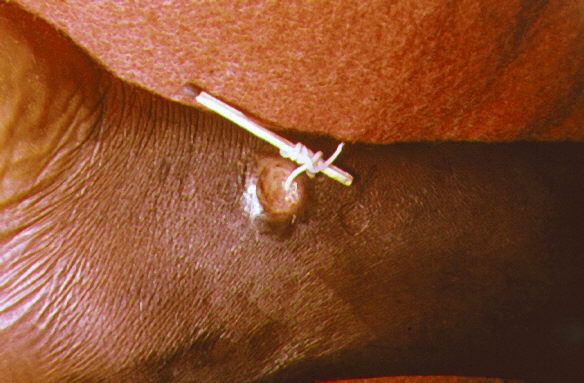
A D. medinensis worm is wrapped around a stick as it emerges.

There is no medicine to kill D. medinensis or prevent it from causing disease once within the body. Instead, treatment focuses on slowly and carefully removing the worm from the wound over days to weeks. Once the blister bursts and the worm begins to emerge, the wound is soaked in a bucket of water, allowing the worm to empty itself of larvae away from a source of drinking water. As the first part of the worm emerges, it is typically wrapped around a piece of gauze or a stick to maintain steady tension on the worm, encouraging its exit. Each day, several centimeters of the worm emerge from the blister, and the stick is wound to maintain tension. This is repeated daily until the full worm emerges, typically within a month. If too much tension is applied, the worm can break and die, leading to severe swelling and pain at the site of the ulcer.

Treatment for dracunculiasis also includes regular wound care to avoid infection of the open ulcer. The US Centers for Disease Control and Prevention (CDC) recommends cleaning the wound before the worm emerges. Once the worm begins to exit the body, the CDC recommends daily wound care: cleaning the wound, applying antibiotic ointment, and replacing the bandage with fresh gauze. Painkillers like aspirin or ibuprofen can help ease the pain of the worm's exit.

== Outcomes ==
Dracunculiasis is a debilitating disease, causing substantial disability in around half of those infected. People with worms emerging can be disabled for the three to ten weeks it takes the worms to fully emerge. When worms emerge near joints, inflammation or infection of the affected area can result in permanent stiffness, pain, or destruction of the joint. Some people with dracunculiasis have continuing pain for 12 to 18 months after the worm has emerged. Around 1% of dracunculiasis cases result in death from secondary infections of the wound.

When dracunculiasis was widespread, it often affected entire villages at once. Outbreaks occurring during planting and harvesting seasons severely impaired a community's agricultural operations – earning dracunculiasis the descriptor "empty granary disease" in some places. Communities affected by dracunculiasis also see reduced school attendance as children of affected parents must take over farm or household duties, and affected children may be physically prevented from walking to school for weeks.

Infection does not create immunity, so people can repeatedly experience dracunculiasis throughout their lives.

== Epidemiology ==
Reported cases of guinea worm disease

Dracunculiasis has become rare, with 10–15 human cases reported worldwide per year (15 in 2021, 13 in 2022, 14 in 2023, 15 in 2024, and 10 in 2025). This is down from 27 cases in 2020 and dramatically less than the estimated 3.5 million annual cases in 20 countries in 1986 – the year the World Health Assembly first called for dracunculiasis's eradication. Dracunculiasis remains endemic primarily in three countries – Chad, Ethiopia and South Sudan. Three additional countries remain to be certified as free of dracunculiasis transmission that have had no reported cases since at least 2023: Angola, Mali, and Sudan. One of these, Sudan, is pre-certified but not yet confirmed free of transmissions. Additionally, although Cameroon has been certified free of internal transmission since 2007, it has experienced three cases since 2019 along its border with Chad.

Dracunculiasis is a disease of extreme poverty, occurring in places where there is poor access to clean drinking water. Cases tend to be split roughly equally between males and females and can occur in all age groups. Within a given place, dracunculiasis risk is linked to occupation; people who farm or fetch drinking water are most likely to be infected.

When dracunculiasis was widespread, it had a seasonal cycle, though the timing varied by location. Along the Sahara desert's southern edge, cases peaked during the mid-year rainy season (May–October) when stagnant water sources were more abundant. Along the Gulf of Guinea, cases were more common during the dry season (October–March) when flowing water sources dried up.

=== Eradication ===
Reported cases of guinea worm disease since 1980

The campaign to eradicate dracunculiasis began at the urging of the CDC in 1980. Following smallpox eradication (last case in 1977; eradication certified in 1981), dracunculiasis was considered an achievable eradication target since it was preventable with only behavioral changes and less common than many similar diseases of poverty. In 1981, the steering committee for the United Nations International Drinking Water Supply and Sanitation Decade (a program to improve global drinking water from 1981 to 1990) adopted the goal of eradicating dracunculiasis as part of their efforts. The following June, an international meeting termed "Workshop on Opportunities for Control of Dracunculiasis" concluded that dracunculiasis could be eradicated through public education, drinking water improvement, and larvicide treatments. In response, India began its national eradication program in 1983.

In 1986, the 39th World Health Assembly issued a statement endorsing dracunculiasis eradication and calling on member states to craft eradication plans. The same year, the Carter Center began collaborating with the government of Pakistan to initiate its national program, which then launched in 1988. By 1996, national eradication programs had been launched in nearly every country with endemic dracunculiasis: Ghana and Nigeria in 1989; Cameroon in 1991; Togo, Burkina Faso, Senegal, and Uganda in 1992; Benin, Mauritania, Niger, Mali, and Côte d'Ivoire in 1993; Sudan, Kenya, Chad, and Ethiopia in 1994; Yemen and the Central African Republic in 1995.

Each national eradication program had three phases. The first phase consisted of a nationwide search to identify the extent of dracunculiasis transmission and develop national and regional plans of action. The second phase involved the training and distribution of staff and volunteers to provide public education village-by-village, surveil for cases, and deliver water filters. This continued and evolved as needed until the national burden of disease was very low. Then, in a third phase, programs intensified surveillance efforts to identify each case within 24 hours of the worm emerging and preventing the person from contaminating drinking water supplies. Most national programs offered voluntary in-patient centers, where those affected could stay and receive food and care until their worms were removed.

In May 1991, the 44th World Health Assembly called for an international certification system to verify dracunculiasis transmission eradication country-by-country. To this end, in 1995 the WHO established the International Commission for the Certification of Dracunculiasis Eradication (ICCDE). Once a country reports zero cases of dracunculiasis for a calendar year, the ICCDE considers that country to have interrupted Guinea worm transmission and entered the "precertification phase". If the country reports zero cases in each of the next three calendar years, the ICCDE sends a team to the country to assess the country's disease surveillance systems and to verify the country's reports. The ICCDE can then formally recommend the WHO Director-General certify a country as free of dracunculiasis transmission.

Since the initiation of the global eradication program, the ICCDE has certified 16 of the original endemic countries as having eradicated dracunculiasis transmission: Pakistan in 1997; India in 2000; Senegal and Yemen in 2004; the Central African Republic and Cameroon in 2007; Benin, Mauritania, and Uganda in 2009; Burkina Faso and Togo in 2011; Côte d'Ivoire, Niger, and Nigeria in 2013; Ghana in 2015, and the Democratic Republic of the Congo in 2022. In 2020, the 76th World Health Assembly endorsed a new guidance plan, the Roadmap for Neglected Tropical Diseases 2021–2030, which set a 2027 target for eradication of dracunculiasis, which would enable certification by the end of 2030.

Due to the importance of animals as reservoirs for Guinea worm disease, a modified definition of worldwide eradication of dracunculiasis was adopted by the International Commission for the Certification of Dracunculiasis Eradication in 2023. The modified definition requires "the confirmed absence of the emergence of adult female worms in human beings and animals for three consecutive years or longer at the global level" (emphasis added). In January 2026, the Carter Center reported approximately 700 cases detected in animals in 6 countries in 2025, primarily in Cameroon (445 cases), Chad (147) and Angola (70). The total had risen slightly in 2025 due to increases in Cameroon and Angola.

== History ==
Diseases consistent with the effects of dracunculiasis are referenced by writers throughout antiquity. Plutarch's Symposiacon refers to a (lost) description by the 2nd-century BCE writer Agatharchides concerning a "hitherto unheard-of disease" in which "small worms issue from [people's] arms and legs ... insinuating themselves between the muscles [to] give rise to horrible sufferings". Greco-Roman and Persian physicians, including Galen, Rhazes, and Avicenna, also wrote of diseases whose symptoms are consistent with dracunculiasis, though there was some disagreement as to the nature of the disease, with some attributing it to a worm, while others considered it to be a corrupted part of the body emerging.

Some have proposed links between dracunculiasis and other prominent ancient texts and symbols. In a 1674 treatise on dracunculiasis, Georg Hieronymous Velschius ascribed serpentine figures in several ancient icons to Dracunculus, including Greek sculptures, signs of the zodiac, Arabic lettering, and the Rod of Asclepius, a common symbol of the medical profession. Similarly, parasitologist Friedrich Küchenmeister proposed in 1855 that the "fiery serpents" that plague the Hebrews in the Old Testament represented dracunculiasis. (Note: This theory was criticised at the time, with The British Medical Journal's book review pointing out differences in the disease's incubation time and fatality, making it a poor match for the Book of Numbers description.) In 1959, parasitologist Reinhard Hoeppli proposed that a prescription in the Ebers papyrus – a medical text written around 1500 BCE – referred to the removal of a Guinea worm, an identification endorsed ten years later by the physician and Egyptologist Paul Ghalioungui; this would make the Ebers papyrus the oldest known description of the disease. (Note: Ghalioungui translates Ebers No. 875 thus: If you examine a swelling ... on any body-part of man, you must apply thereon a bandage; and if you find it coming and going and clinging to the flesh which is under it ... You must perform a knife treatment, cutting it out with a ds-knife and that which is in its interior is seized with the hnw-instrument ... You must then extirpate it with the ds-knife ... It shall be seized with the hnwjt-part of any colocynch. A swelling that is like a head is to be treated likewise.)

Carl Linnaeus included the Guinea worm in his 1758 edition of Systema Naturae, naming it Gordius medinensis. The name medinensis refers to the worm's longstanding association with the Arabian Peninsula city of Medina, with Avicenna writing in his The Canon of Medicine (published in 1025) "The disease is commonest at Medina, whence it takes its name". In Johann Friedrich Gmelin's 1788 update of Linnaeus's Systema Naturae, Gmelin renamed the worm Filaria medinensis, leaving Gordius for free-living worms. Henry Bastian authored the first detailed description of the worm itself, published in 1863. The following year, in his book Entozoa, Thomas Spencer Cobbold used the name Dracunculus medinensis, which was enshrined as the official name by the International Commission on Zoological Nomenclature in 1915. Despite longstanding knowledge that the worm was associated with water, the lifecycle of D. medinensis was the topic of protracted debate. Alexei Pavlovich Fedchenko filled a major gap with his 1870 publication describing that D. medinensis larvae can infect and develop inside copepods. (Note: Fedchenko suggested that this discovery was serendipitous based on his observations of many waterborne animals. However, Rudolf Leuckart claimed that he had advised Fedchenko to investigate Cyclops copepods due to the similarity between D. medinensis and the fish parasite Cucullanus elegans, the life cycle of which Leuckart had described in 1865.) The next step was shown by Robert Thomson Leiper, who described in a 1907 paper that monkeys fed D. medinensis–infected copepods developed mature Guinea worms, while monkeys directly fed D. medinensis larvae did not.

In the 19th and 20th centuries, dracunculiasis was widespread across nearly all of Africa and South Asia, though no exact case counts exist from the pre-eradication era. In a 1947 article in the Journal of Parasitology, Norman R. Stoll used rough estimates of populations in endemic areas to suggest that there could have been as many as 48 million cases of dracunculiasis per year. In 1976, the WHO estimated the global burden at 10 million cases per year. Ten years later, as the eradication effort was beginning, the WHO estimated 3.5 million cases per year worldwide.

== Other animals ==
In addition to humans, D. medinensis can infect domestic dogs and cats and wild olive baboons. Infections of domestic dogs have been particularly common in Chad, where they helped reignite dracunculiasis transmission in 2010. Animals are thought to become infected by eating a transport host, likely a fish or amphibian. As with humans, control efforts have focused on preventing infection by encouraging people in affected areas to bury fish entrails, as well as to identify and tie up dogs and cats with emerging worms so that they cannot access drinking water sources until after the worms have emerged. Animal infections have been rapidly falling, with 2,000 recorded infections in 2019, 1,601 in 2020, and 863 in 2021. Domestic ferrets can be infected with D. medinensis (and D. insignis) in laboratory settings, and have been used as an animal disease model for human dracunculiasis.

Other Dracunculus species can infect snakes, turtles, and other reptiles. Animal infections are most widespread in snakes, with nine different species of Dracunculus described in snakes in the United States, Brazil, India, Vietnam, Australia, Papua New Guinea, Benin, Madagascar, and Italy. The only other reptiles affected are snapping turtles, with cases of infected common snapping turtles described in several US states and a single infected South American snapping turtle described in Costa Rica. Infections of non-human mammals are limited to the Americas. Raccoons in the US and Canada are most widely affected, particularly by D. insignis; however, Dracunculus worms have also been reported in American skunks, coyotes, foxes, opossums, domestic dogs, domestic cats, and (rarely) muskrats and beavers.
