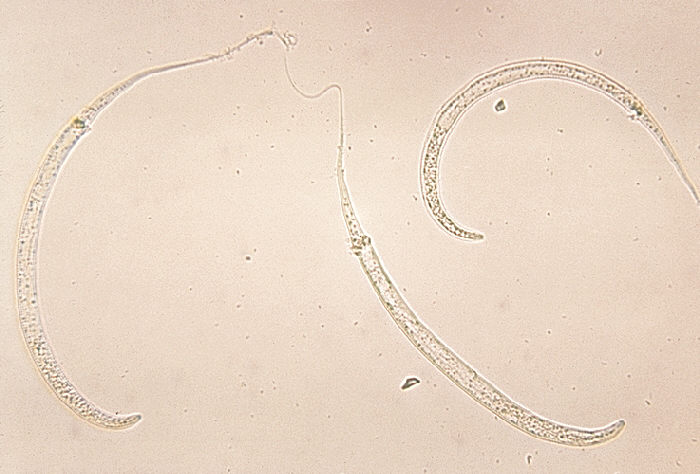
- Photomicrograph of larvae

Scientific classification
- Kingdom: Animalia
- Phylum: Nematoda
- Class: Secernentea
- Order: Camallanida
- Family: Dracunculidae
- Genus: Dracunculus
- Species: D. medinensis

Binomial name
- Dracunculus medinensis (Linnaeus, 1758)

Synonyms
- Gordius medinensis Linnaeus, 1758

= Dracunculus medinensis =

Guinea worm

Species of parasitic worm

Dracunculus medinensis (Guinea worm, dragon worm, fiery serpent) is a nematode that causes dracunculiasis, also known as Guinea worm disease. The disease is caused by the female which, at around 80 centimetres (31 inches) in length, is among the longest nematodes infecting humans. The length of specimens exhibits extreme sexual dimorphism, as the longest recorded male Guinea worm is only 4 cm (1 1/2 in).

Guinea worm disease is on target to be the second infectious disease of humans to be eradicated, after smallpox, and the D. medinensis species would be made extinct to accomplish it. It was formerly endemic to a wide swath of Africa and Eurasia; as of 2023, it remains endemic in five countries: Chad, Mali, South Sudan, Angola and Ethiopia, with most cases in Chad. Guinea worm spread to Angola c. 2018, and it is considered endemic there. Infection of domestic dogs is a serious complication in Chad.

The common name "Guinea worm" is derived from the Guinea region of Western Africa.

== History ==
Dracunculus medinensis ("little dragon from Medina") was described in Egypt as early as the 15th century BCE and possibly was the "fiery serpent" afflicting the Israelites described in the Bible.

In the mid-19th century, the nematode Camallanus lacustris, which infects freshwater fish, was discovered to develop in copepods. This led Russian naturalist Alexei Pavlovich Fedchenko to discover in 1870 that D. medinensis is similarly transmitted via copepod intermediate hosts.

== Life cycle ==
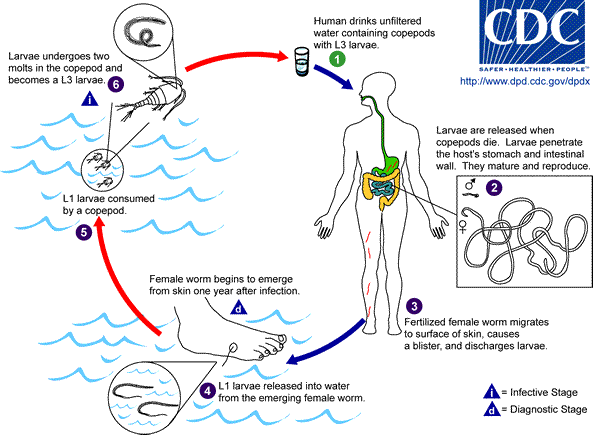
General lifecycle of D. medinensis in humans

D. medinensis L1 larvae are found in fresh water, where they are ingested by copepods (small crustaceans) of the genus Cyclops. Within the copepod, the D. medinensis larvae develop to an infective L3 stage within 14 days. When the infected copepod is ingested by a mammalian host drinking unfiltered water, the copepod is then dissolved by stomach acid and dies and the D. medinensis larvae are released and migrate through the wall of the mammalian intestine, and enter the abdominal cavity and retro-peritoneal space, where they mature into adults. After maturing and mating within the host, the males die and females (length 60–100 cm or 24–39 in or longer) migrate in subcutaneous tissue towards the skin's surface. Around a year after the infection, the female causes the formation of a blister on the skin's surface, generally on the lower extremities, though occasionally on the hand or scrotum. When the blister ruptures, the female slowly emerges over the course of several days or weeks. This causes extreme pain and irritation to the host. During those few days to hours before the worm exits the skin, the person may develop a fever, pain, or swelling in that area. If the host—in an attempt to alleviate the excruciating burning pain—submerges the affected body part in water, the female releases thousands of larvae into the water. From here, the larvae infect copepods, continuing the life cycle. After the worm exits the skin, the wound caused by the emerging worm often develops a secondary bacterial infection. Permanent damage can occur if the infection goes untreated around a joint. Most cases occur in areas without access to health care facilities.

=== Animal reservoirs ===
In 2020, Guinea worm was found in 1,507 domestic dogs in Chad, 15 in Ethiopia, and eight in Mali, as well as in 61 domestic cats in Chad and three in Ethiopia. Small numbers have also been found in wildcats and baboons. These findings are a potential problem for the eradication program.

== Epidemiology ==
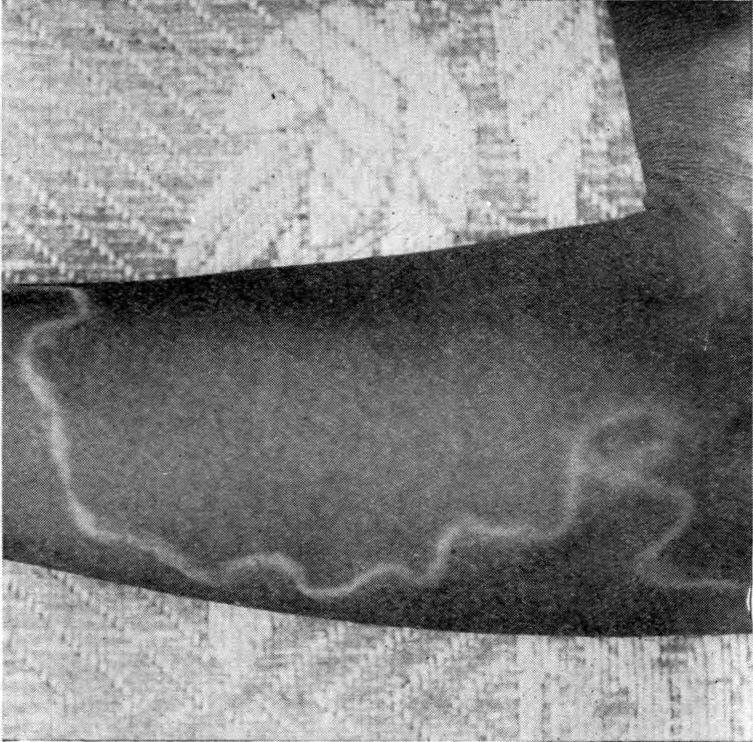
A medinensis female visible under the skin of the forearm

D. medinensis is most commonly found in the subtropic to tropical regions, especially in India, south-west Asia (Iraq, Iran, Pakistan, etc.), and rural areas of Africa, where temperatures of 25–30 °C (77–86 °F) are best for larval development. The parasite relies on people accidentally consuming microcrustaceans of the genus Cyclops (copepods), which dwell in stationary bodies of water such as ponds; large, open wells (with stairs); or rain-filled cisterns. The infection occurs most during times of drought or the "dry-season" in humid climates, or during or just after the rain season in the "semiarid, wet-and-dry-climates". This is due to the lower surface water of the stationary bodies of water, which are prime for the growth of the infected copepods, and the main source of water for many people.

== Pathology ==
D. medinensis causes dracunculiasis as a result of the emergence of the female worm, non-emergence of adult worms (usually the male), and secondary bacterial infections. As it emerges to the subcutaneous tissue, the female releases a toxic chemical that may result in nausea, rash at site, diarrhea, dizziness, localized edema, reddish papule, blister, and itching. Arthritis or paraplegia can result from a worm that fails to reach the skin and gets calcified in or along the joint or finds its way into the central nervous tissue. Aseptic abscesses and cystic swelling can also occur when worms rupture before emerging, causing an acute inflammatory response from the host's immune system.

== Treatment ==
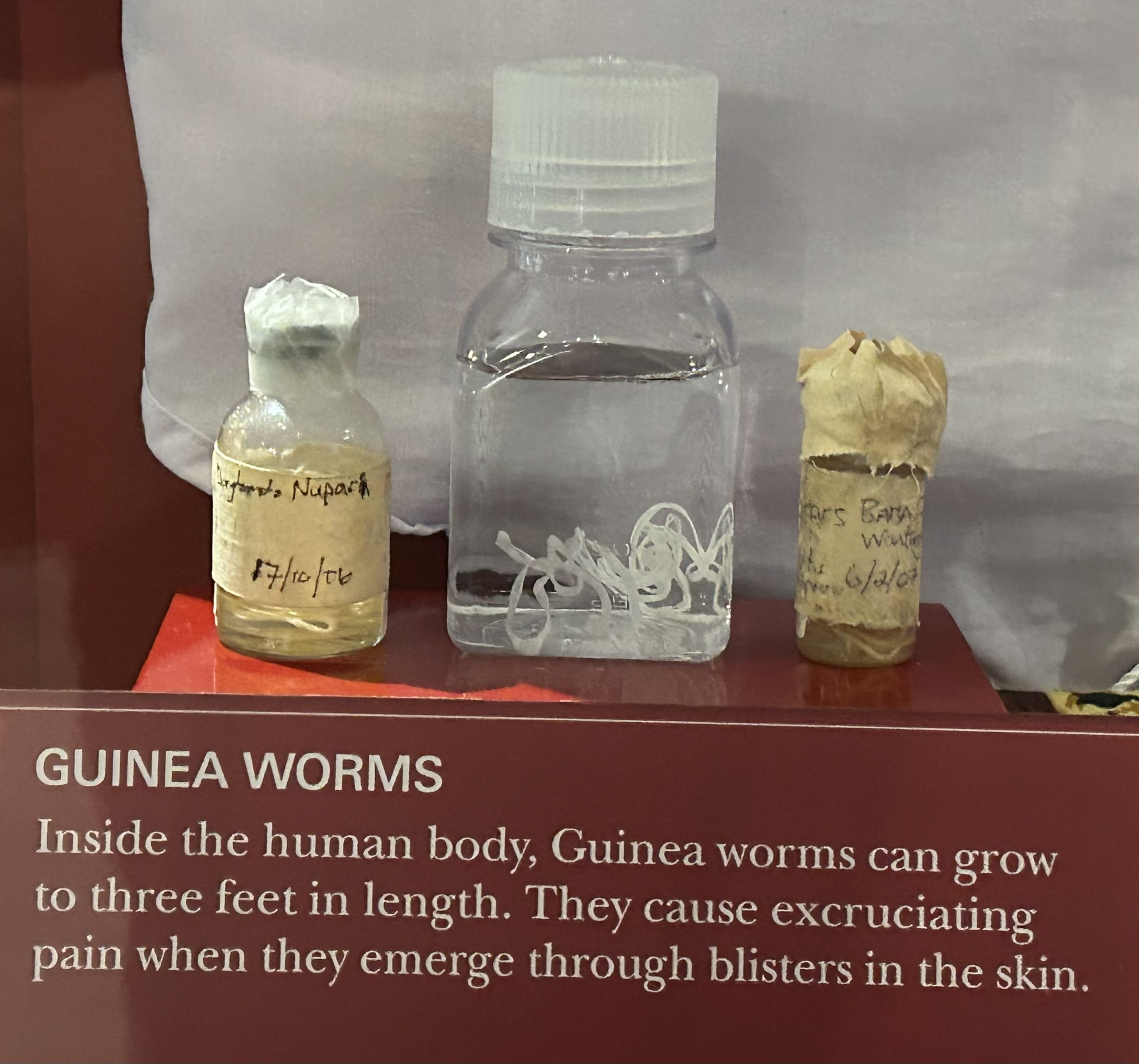
Specimens on display at the Jimmy Carter Library and Museum

The female Guinea worm slowly starts to emerge from the host's skin after the blister ruptures. The most common method for removing the worm involves submerging the affected body part in water to help coax the worm out. The site is then cleaned thoroughly. Then, slight pressure is applied to the worm as it is slowly pulled out of the wound. To avoid breaking the worm, pulling should stop when resistance is met. Full extraction of the female Guinea worm usually takes several days. After each day's worth of extraction, the exposed portion of the worm is wrapped around a piece of rolled-up gauze or small stick to maintain tension. This method of wrapping the worm around a stick or gauze is speculated to be the source for the Rod of Asclepius, the symbol of medicine. Once secure, topical antibiotics are applied to the affected region to help prevent secondary infections due to bacteria. The area is then wrapped in gauze to protect the wound. The same steps are repeated each day until the whole worm has been removed from the lesion.

== Control and prevention of the parasite ==
Guinea worm cases by year
Year	Reported cases	Countries
1986	estimated 3,500,000	21
1989	892,055	15
1992	374,202	15
1995	129,852	19
2000	75,223	16
2001	63,717	16
2002	54,638	14
2003	32,193	13
2004	16,026	13
2005	10,674	12
2006	25,217 (Note: Increase in reported cases resulted from improved reporting in southern Sudan following the peace agreement in 2005.)	10
2007	9,585	9
2008	4,619	7
2009	3,190	5
2010	1,797	4 (6)
2011	1,060	4
2012	542	4
2013	148	5
2014	126	4
2015	22	4
2016	25	3
2017	30	2
2018	28	3
2019	54 (Note: Increase over 2018 due to increased reporting, due to cash rewards in Chad for reporting cases.)	4
2020	27	6
2021	15	4
2022	13	4
2023	14	4
2024	15	2
2025	10	3

In the 1980s, the Carter Center initiated a program to eradicate the Guinea worm. The campaign began in 1980 at the U.S. Centers for Disease Control and Prevention. In 1984, the CDC was designated by the World Health Organization as the "Collaborating Center for Research, Training, and Eradication of D. medinensis". More than twenty countries were affected by Guinea worms in 1986. That year, WHO started the eradication program with the Carter Center leading the effort. The program included education of people in affected areas that the disease was caused by larvae in drinking water, isolation and support for affected people, and – crucially – widespread distribution of net filters and pipe filters for drinking water, and education about the importance of using them.

As of 2015, the species has been reported to be near eradication. The International Commission for the Certification of Dracunculus Eradication has certified 198 countries, territories, and other WHO represented areas. As of January 2015, eight countries were yet to be certified as Guinea worm–free: Angola, the Democratic Republic of the Congo, Kenya, Sudan, Chad, Ethiopia, Mali, and South Sudan; of these, only in Chad, Ethiopia, Mali, and South Sudan does D. medinensis remain endemic.

As of 2024, the disease has been reduced by more than 99.99% and more than 100 million cases have been prevented.

== See also ==
- Planned extinction
