= Anguillicoloides papernai =

Scientific classification
- Domain: Eukaryota
- Kingdom: Animalia
- Phylum: Nematoda
- Class: Secernentea
- Order: Camallanida
- Family: Dracunculidae
- Genus: Anguillicoloides
- Species: A. papernai

Binomial name
- Anguillicoloides papernai Moravec & Taraschewski, 1988

Synonyms
- Anguillicola papernai

Species of roundworm

Anguillicoloides papernai is a parasitic nematode worm that lives in the swimbladders of eels, particularly Anguilla mossambica. Specimens have been located in Cape Province, South Africa. It is named after Dr. Ilan Paperna. What differentiates this species from its congeners is the presence of marked cuticular excrescences on the anterior and posterior ends of the body and the location of the buccal capsule deeply inside the head end. This species was the first Anguillicola member described from Africa.

The state of being colonized by Anguillicola nematodes is termed anguillicolosis.
