= Chloropterus versicolor =

Scientific classification
- Kingdom: Animalia
- Phylum: Arthropoda
- Clade: Pancrustacea
- Class: Insecta
- Order: Coleoptera
- Suborder: Polyphaga
- Infraorder: Cucujiformia
- Family: Chrysomelidae
- Genus: Chloropterus
- Species: C. versicolor

Binomial name
- Chloropterus versicolor (Morawitz, 1860)

Synonyms
- Heterocnemis versicolor Morawitz, 1860; Chloropterus versicolor var. immaculatus Pic, 1909; Chloropterus versicolor var. infuscatus Sahlberg, 1913

Species of beetle

Chloropterus versicolor is a species of beetle in the leaf beetle family, subfamily Eumolpinae. It is distributed in Ukraine, southern European Russia, Turkey, Azerbaijan, Kazakhstan and Turkmenistan. It was first described as Heterocnemis versicolor by Ferdinand Morawitz in 1860.
