= The President and the Dragon =

Documentary film

The President and the Dragon is a 2024 documentary film which follows former U.S. president Jimmy Carter in his mission to eradicate the Guinea worm.
