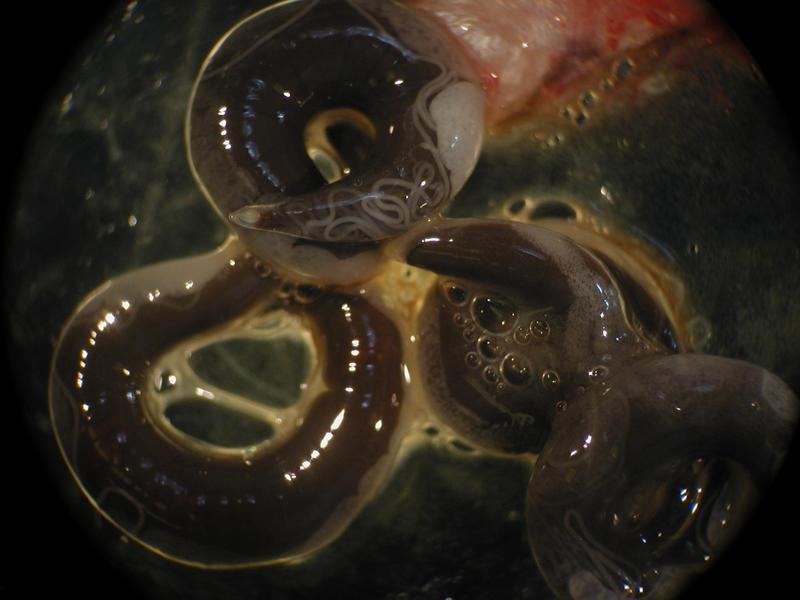
- Four specimens of Anguillicola crassus

Scientific classification
- Domain: Eukaryota
- Kingdom: Animalia
- Phylum: Nematoda
- Class: Secernentea
- Order: Camallanida
- Family: Dracunculidae
- Genus: Anguillicoloides
- Species: A. crassus

Binomial name
- Anguillicoloides crassus (Kuwahara, Niimi & Hagaki, 1974)

Synonyms
- Anguillicola crassus Kuwahara, Niimi & Hagaki, 1974

= Anguillicoloides crassus =

Species of roundworm

Anguillicoloides crassus is a parasitic nematode worm that lives in the swimbladders of eels (Anguilla spp.) and appears to spread easily among eel populations after introduction to a body of water. It is considered to be one of the threats to the sustainability of populations of European eel (Anguilla anguilla). It was introduced to the European continent in the 1980s, where it was reported independently from Germany and Italy in 1982, having probably been introduced from Taiwan. It is thought to have reached England in 1987 from continental Europe. It is a natural parasite of the Japanese eel in its native range.

The life cycle of Anguillicoloides crassus begins when the adult nematode releases thousands of eggs in the eel's swimbladder. The eggs pass through the eel's digestive tract and the larvae emerge in the water and settle onto the substrate. They are ingested by their intermediate host, which is often a copepod or other crustacean but may also be a fish. The nematode larva reaches its infective stage within this intermediate host. The host is eaten by an eel, and the nematode finds its way from the eel's digestive tract to its swimbladder. An eel with an advanced parasite load shows symptoms such as bleeding lesions and swimbladder collapse. The eel becomes more susceptible to disease, its rate of growth slows, and if the infestation is severe enough, it may die. Since the swimbladder is the buoyant organ which allows the eel to swim, a severe parasite infestation can hamper its ability to reach its spawning grounds.

The state of being colonized by Anguillicola nematodes is termed anguillicolosis.

== Adaptation to the European eel ==
Three significant changes were made to the life cycle of A. crassus which facilitated its success in colonizing A. anguila.

First, it utilizes paratenic hosts in its transmission, such as a number of freshwater fish, amphibians, snails and aquatic insects. Despite there being no record of the use of paratenic hosts in A. crassus transmission cycles in Asia, this possibility has not been rejected.

The suitability of paratenic hosts in facilitating transmission differs according to species, with physostome (open swimbladder) fish being less suitable than physoclist (closed swimbladder) fish. The latter allow further development of A. crassus larvae into the fourth stage and have lower rates of encapsulation, thereby permitting longer rates of survival.

Infected copepods tend to inhabit epibenthic regions due to their sluggish movement. Benthic fish also acquire greater parasite loads, due to their tendency to prey on epibenthic intermediate hosts or other paratenic hosts. Therefore, the composition of a fishery, such as a lake, could have an important influence of A. crassus within a particular locality.

Second, A. crassus larvae have the ability to infect several species of freshwater cyclopoid copepod, as well as estuarine copepods e.g. Eurytemora affinis. This allows transmission of the parasite within a wide range of aquatic habitats.

Third, the larvae remain for longer within the host's swimbladder wall whilst developing into the fourth larval stage, as opposed to moving directly through it (as occurs in Pacific eels).

== Effects on hosts ==
=== Individual hosts ===
The hosts' swimbladder wall becomes inflamed as cells undergo fibrosis, which can prevent further invasion by A. crassus larvae. High parasitic loads (>10 adult nematodes per eel) can reduce the proportion of oxygen in the swimbladder by about 60% in comparison to uninfected eels. Structural changes include possible alterations in the epithelial cells, hindering processes involved in acidification of the blood and leading to a decline in the rate of gas deposition. Mortality may also be linked to secondary bacterial infection, particularly in intensive eel farms. Infected eels are also less resistant to stress, with infections causing large increases in serum cortisol levels (an important primary messenger of stress response in teleost fish).

=== Populations ===
Mortalities are both more intense and identifiable within eel farms than in the wild. Thus, it is difficult to compare losses between wild and farmed eels.

The best documented cases of mass A. anguilla mortalities are from the summer of 1991, in Lake Balaton, Hungary, and the Vranov reservoir in the Czech Republic during 1994. Both displayed similar characteristics involving low water oxygen levels, coupled with high temperatures, plus high eel densities and A. crassus infection levels. These conditions are the same outlined as ideal for epizootics by Barus and Prokes, 1996. It has been suggested that the highly stressful conditions in the lakes were compounded by the intense parasite presence (in Lake Balaton, burdens were as high as 30–50 adults and 200 larvae per eel).

Parallels between Lake Balaton and another water body, the Neusiedler See in Austria, could counter the extreme effects of A. crassus on eel populations under these conditions. The small size of the eels (<50 cm long) due to the high eel density in the lake actually prevented high parasite loads, and the absence of mosquito insecticides in this case is thought to help explain the lack of mass mortalities.

=== Migration ===
A. crassus has been repeatedly blamed for the dramatic drop in eel recruitment during the 1980s, although this level of blame has receded in recent years. The effects of A. crassus on eel populations are not isolated, but are part of a synergistic effect composed of factors including over-fishing of elvers, habitat loss, global warming and pollution all have significant effects on eel recruitment. Doubt over mostly attributing this drop to A. crassus stemmed from an observation that during the period A. anguilla suffered a large drop in recruitment, the American eel Anguilla rostrata experienced a similar decline (98%) in North America, despite A. crassus having not been introduced to that ecosystem at that point.

The parasite could possibly impair the migration of eels to the Sargasso Sea, where European and American eels spawn. For European eels, this migration involves a journey of about 5500 km. Research has been carried out to precisely quantify the possible damage a given parasite load could have in the ability of a silver eel to migrate and reproduce. In an experiment to assess the energetic cost of the migration in general, it was shown that eels with less than 13% fat reserves would not be capable of reaching their spawning ground. Looking at the effect of an A. crassus burden, however, showed that heavy parasite burdens do affect swimming performance and reproductive output following migration.
