= Carabus akinini =

Scientific classification
- Domain: Eukaryota
- Kingdom: Animalia
- Phylum: Arthropoda
- Class: Insecta
- Order: Coleoptera
- Suborder: Adephaga
- Family: Carabidae
- Genus: Carabus
- Species: C. akinini

Binomial name
- Carabus akinini Morawitz, 1886

Species of beetle

Carabus akinini is a species of ground beetle from Carabinae subfamily that can be found in China, Kazakhstan, and Kyrgyzstan.

Subspecies include:

- Carabus akinini akinini
- Carabus akinini buffi
- Carabus akinini elisabethae
- Carabus akinini ketmenensis
- Carabus akinini loudai
