= Carabus akinini akinini =

Scientific classification
- Domain: Eukaryota
- Kingdom: Animalia
- Phylum: Arthropoda
- Class: Insecta
- Order: Coleoptera
- Suborder: Adephaga
- Family: Carabidae
- Genus: Carabus
- Species: C. akinini
- Subspecies: C. a. akinini

Trinomial name
- Carabus akinini akinini Morawitz, 1886

Synonyms
- Carabus severovi Deuve, 1992 "East of Karakul River"; Carabus oitalensis Obydov, 1998; Carabus intestinus Obydov, 1998

Subspecies of beetle

Carabus akinini akinini is a bronze coloured subspecies of beetle from family Carabidae, that is endemic to Kyrgyzstan. They are brownish-black coloured with either red or black pronotum. The males of the subspecies are 18–22 millimetres (0.71–0.87 in) long, while females are 21 millimetres (0.83 in).
