= Chloropterus mateui =

Scientific classification
- Kingdom: Animalia
- Phylum: Arthropoda
- Clade: Pancrustacea
- Class: Insecta
- Order: Coleoptera
- Suborder: Polyphaga
- Infraorder: Cucujiformia
- Family: Chrysomelidae
- Genus: Chloropterus
- Species: C. mateui

Binomial name
- Chloropterus mateui (Selman, 1969)

Synonyms
- Atomyria mateui Selman, 1969

Species of beetle

Chloropterus mateui is a species of leaf beetle found in Algeria. It was first described as a species of Atomyria in 1969 by Brian J. Selman, based on a series of specimens collected from the western Sahara. One of these specimens was collected from the desert shrub Tamarix. In 2020, A.G. Moseyko transferred the species to the genus Chloropterus.

C. mateui is very similar in appearance to C. persicus, but the eyes are closer together, the setae are much smaller, the dark markings are less clearly defined, the inner pair of markings on the thorax are more obscure, the outer pair very small. The elytra are shiny and very smooth. The species is also very close to Chloropterus pallidus, also described from Algeria, and has similar coloration.
