= Chloropterus bimaculatus =

Scientific classification
- Kingdom: Animalia
- Phylum: Arthropoda
- Clade: Pancrustacea
- Class: Insecta
- Order: Coleoptera
- Suborder: Polyphaga
- Infraorder: Cucujiformia
- Family: Chrysomelidae
- Genus: Chloropterus
- Species: C. bimaculatus

Binomial name
- Chloropterus bimaculatus (Raffray, 1873)

Synonyms
- Nodostoma bimaculata Raffray, 1873

Species of beetle

Chloropterus bimaculatus is a species of leaf beetle of Algeria and Morocco described by Achille Raffray in 1873.
