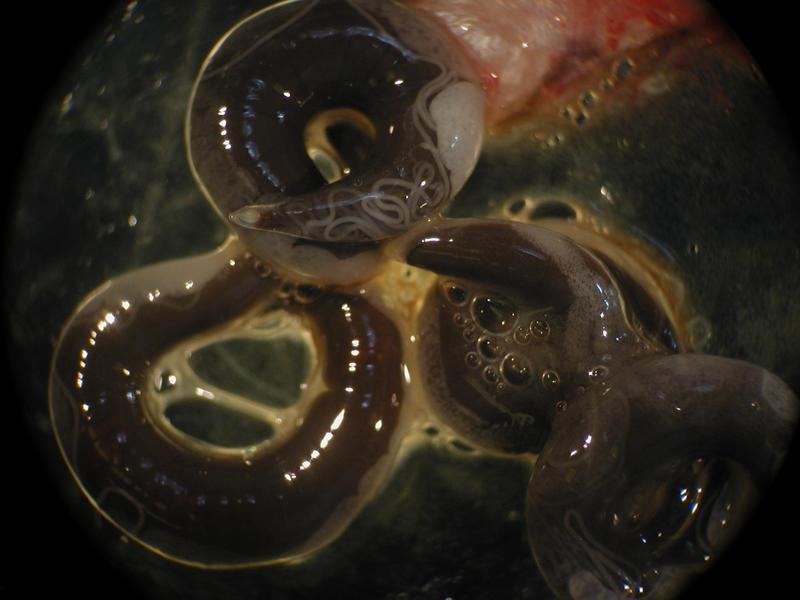
- Anguillicola crassus

Scientific classification
- Domain: Eukaryota
- Kingdom: Animalia
- Phylum: Nematoda
- Class: Secernentea
- Order: Camallanida
- Family: Dracunculidae
- Genus: Anguillicoloides; Moravec & Taraschewski, 1988

= Anguillicoloides =

Genus of roundworms

Anguillicoloides is a genus of nematodes belonging to the family Dracunculidae.

The species of this genus are found in Europe and Northern America.

Species:

- Anguillicoloides australiensis Johnston & Mawson, 1940
- Anguillicoloides crassus (Kuwahara, Niimi & Itagaki, 1974)
- Anguillicoloides novaezelandiae (Moravec & Taraschewski, 1988)
- Anguillicoloides papernai Moravec & Taraschewski, 1988
