= Anguillicoloides novaezelandiae =

Scientific classification
- Domain: Eukaryota
- Kingdom: Animalia
- Phylum: Nematoda
- Class: Secernentea
- Order: Camallanida
- Family: Dracunculidae
- Genus: Anguillicoloides
- Species: A. novaezelandiae

Binomial name
- Anguillicoloides novaezelandiae Moravec & Taraschewski, 1988

Synonyms
- Anguillicola novaezelandiae

Species of roundworm

Anguillicoloides novaezelandiae is a parasitic nematode worm that lives in the swimbladders of eels (Anguilla spp.), particularly Anguilla australiensis, Anguilla anguilla and Anguilla dieffenbachii. Specimens have been located in Italy (where it is thought to have been introduced) and New Zealand (where it is a native species).
