= Ingestion =

Consumption of a substance by an organism

Ingestion is the consumption of a substance by an organism. In animals, it normally is accomplished by taking in a substance through the mouth into the gastrointestinal tract, such as through eating or drinking. In single-celled organisms, ingestion takes place by absorbing a substance through the cell membrane.

Besides nutritional items, substances that may be ingested include medication (where ingestion is termed oral administration), recreational drugs, and substances considered inedible, such as foreign bodies or excrement. Ingestion is a common route taken by pathogenic organisms and poisons entering the body.

Ingestion can also refer to a mechanism picking up something and making it enter an internal hollow of that mechanism, e.g. "a grille was fitted to prevent the pump from ingesting driftwood".

== Pathogens ==
Some pathogens are transmitted via ingestion, including viruses, bacteria, and parasites. Most commonly, this takes place via the faecal-oral route. An intermediate step is often involved, such as drinking water contaminated by faeces or food prepared by workers who fail to practice adequate hand-washing, and is more common in regions where untreated sewage is common. Diseases transmitted via the fecal-oral route include hepatitis A, polio, and cholera.

Some pathogenic organisms are typically ingested by other routes.

- Larvae of the parasite Trichinella encyst within muscles and are transmitted when a new host eats the infected flesh of a former host animal.
- The parasite Dracunculus is ingested in drinking water, which is contaminated with larvae released as the parasite emerges from the host's skin.
- The bacterium Salmonella most commonly infects humans via consumption of undercooked eggs.

== Foreign objects ==
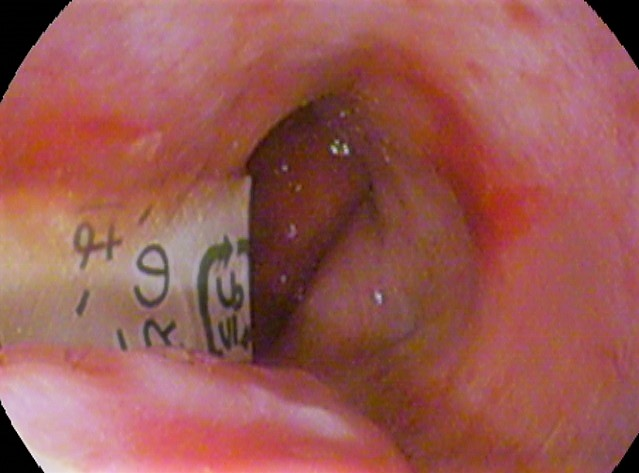
Foreign body in esophagus

Disk batteries, also called button cells, are often mistakenly ingested, particularly by children and the elderly. They may be mistaken for a medication pill because of their size and shape, or they may be swallowed after being held in the mouth while the battery is being changed. Battery ingestion can cause medical problems including blocked airway, vomiting, irritability, persistent drooling, and rash (due to nickel metal allergy).

== Abnormal ingestion ==
Pica is an abnormal appetite for non-nutritive objects or for food items in a form not normally eaten, such as flour. Coprophagia is the consumption of feces, an abnormal ingestive behavior common in some animals.
