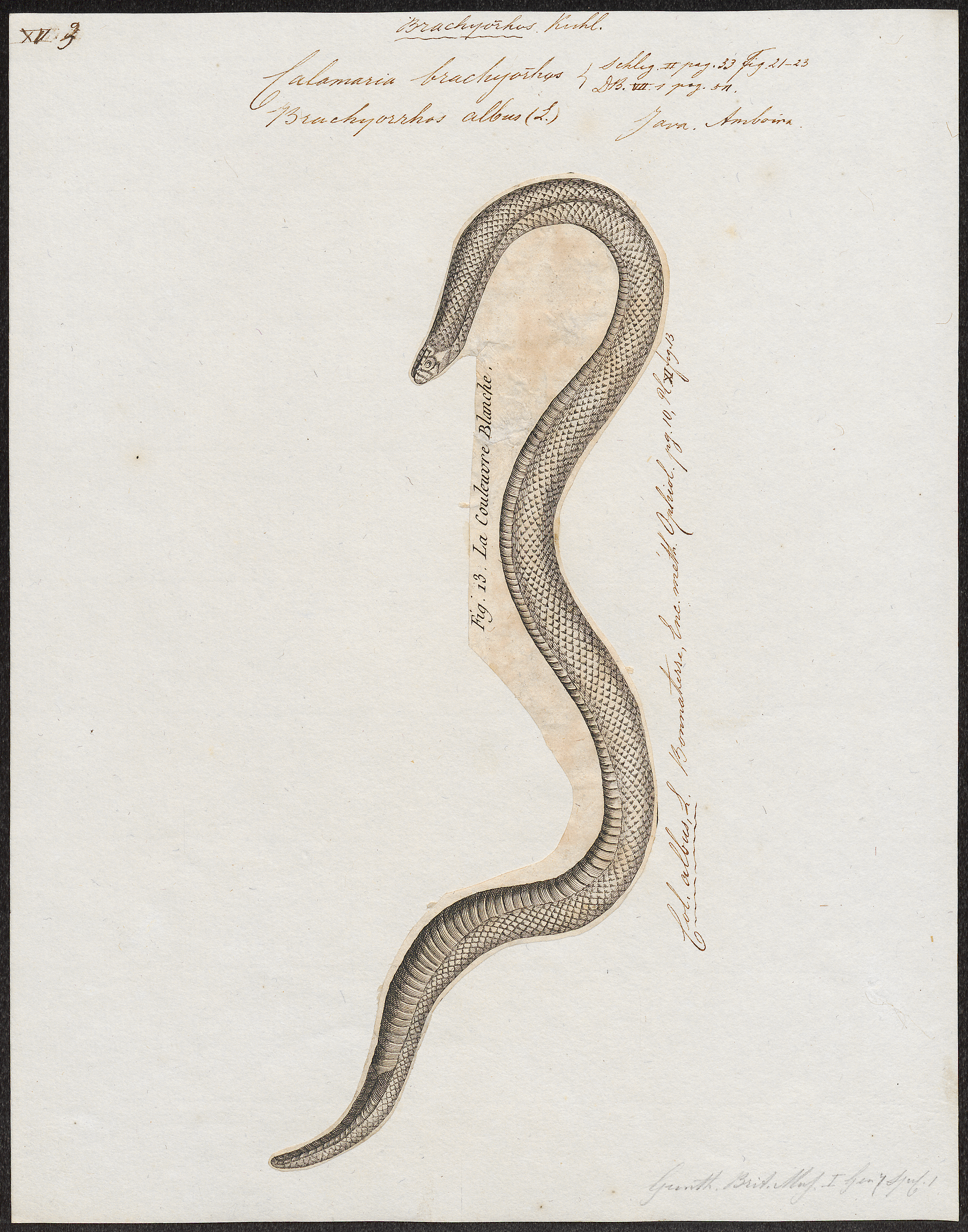

Conservation status
- Least Concern (IUCN 3.1)

Scientific classification
- Kingdom: Animalia
- Phylum: Chordata
- Class: Reptilia
- Order: Squamata
- Suborder: Serpentes
- Family: Homalopsidae
- Genus: Brachyorrhos
- Species: B. albus

Binomial name
- Brachyorrhos albus (Linnaeus, 1758)

Synonyms
- Calamaria brachyorrhos Müller 1857; Coluber albus Linnaeus, 1758

= Brachyorrhos albus =

Species of snake

Brachyorrhos albus, commonly known as the Seram short-tailed snake, is a species of fangless, terrestrial snake found in Indonesia.
