= Chloropterus pallidus =

Scientific classification
- Kingdom: Animalia
- Phylum: Arthropoda
- Clade: Pancrustacea
- Class: Insecta
- Order: Coleoptera
- Suborder: Polyphaga
- Infraorder: Cucujiformia
- Family: Chrysomelidae
- Genus: Chloropterus
- Species: C. pallidus

Binomial name
- Chloropterus pallidus Chobaut, 1898

Species of beetle

Chloropterus pallidus is a species of leaf beetle of Algeria, described by the French entomologist Alfred Chobaut in 1898.
