= Carabus akinini elisabethae =

Scientific classification
- Domain: Eukaryota
- Kingdom: Animalia
- Phylum: Arthropoda
- Class: Insecta
- Order: Coleoptera
- Suborder: Adephaga
- Family: Carabidae
- Genus: Carabus
- Species: C. akinini
- Subspecies: C. a. elisabethae

Trinomial name
- Carabus akinini elisabethae Semenov, 1908

Synonyms
- Carabus convexiusculus Semenov, 1908; Carabus tenuipes Lapouge, 1924 "Wernyi"(Almata)

Subspecies of beetle

Carabus akinini elisabethae is a black-coloured subspecies of ground beetle from family Carabidae, that is endemic to Kazakhstan. The males of the subspecies are ranging from 20–23 millimetres (0.79–0.91 in), while females are 23 millimetres (0.91 in) long.
