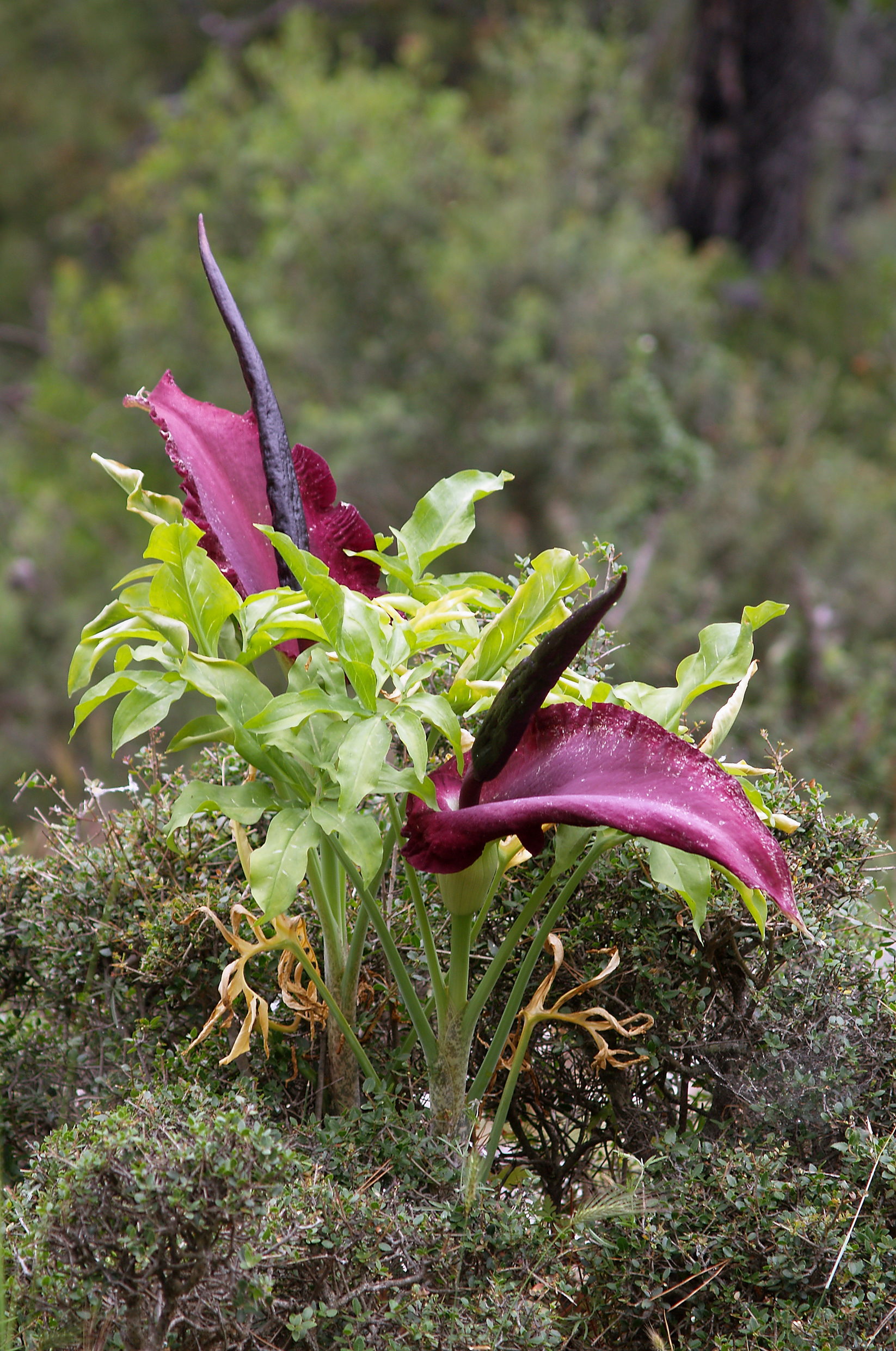

Conservation status
- Least Concern (IUCN 3.1)

Scientific classification
- Kingdom: Plantae
- Clade: Tracheophytes
- Clade: Angiosperms
- Clade: Monocots
- Order: Alismatales
- Family: Araceae
- Genus: Dracunculus
- Species: D. vulgaris

Binomial name
- Dracunculus vulgaris Schott

= Dracunculus vulgaris =

Species of flowering plant in the family Araceae

Dracunculus vulgaris is a species of aroid flowering plant in the genus Dracunculus and the arum family Araceae. Common names include the common dracunculus, dragon lily, dragon arum, black arum and vampire lily. In Greece, part of its native range, the plant is called drakondia, the long spadix being viewed as a small dragon hiding in the spathe.

This herbaceous perennial is endemic to the Balkans, extending as far as Greece, Crete, and the Aegean Islands, and also to the south-western parts of Anatolia.

== Description ==
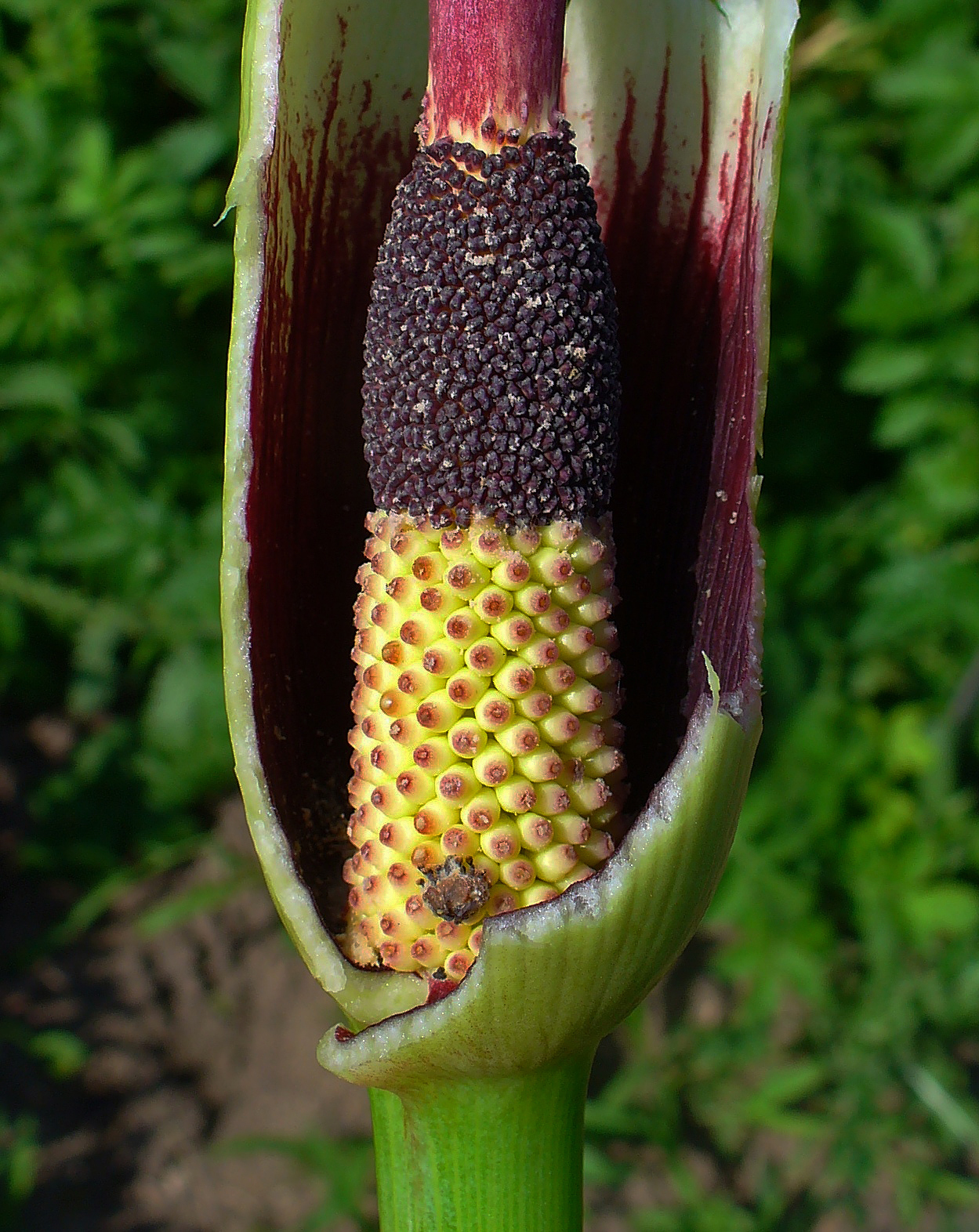
Male flowers (at top) Female flowers (at the bottom).

The species is characterized by a large purple spathe and spadix, which has a very unpleasant smell reminiscent of rotting meat to attract flies (Lucilia and others) as pollinators. The large palmate leaves have occasional cream flecks along the veins.

The dragon lily has the ability to heat itself to a temperature of 18 degrees Celsius. This addition to its traits does not have any correlation to its potent scent, however it does promote the comfort of the insects who choose to pollinate on the lily. The plant itself is large in size with an equally large internal floral chamber as well as an ample landing area for insects. The spathe and floral chamber guide the insects into the plant during the stage of stigma receptivity and then it releases the insects after the pollen is shed. While the flower doesn't close completely, the sticky walls are what make it difficult for the insect to climb out. After a day, the spathe begins to wither and the flies and or beetles are free.

== Cultivation ==
Dracunculus vulgaris has been introduced to northern Europe, Australia, and North America, both to the United States, where it is present in the states of Kansas, Oregon, California, Washington, South Carolina, Tennessee, Kentucky, Michigan, Ohio, the commonwealth of Puerto Rico, and to Canada, where it has been grown in the province of Ontario and Vancouver, B.C.

The plant can tolerate some shade but prefers full sun; it can also withstand drought but benefits from a little watering. The plant prefers a humus-rich, well-drained soil.

== Gallery ==
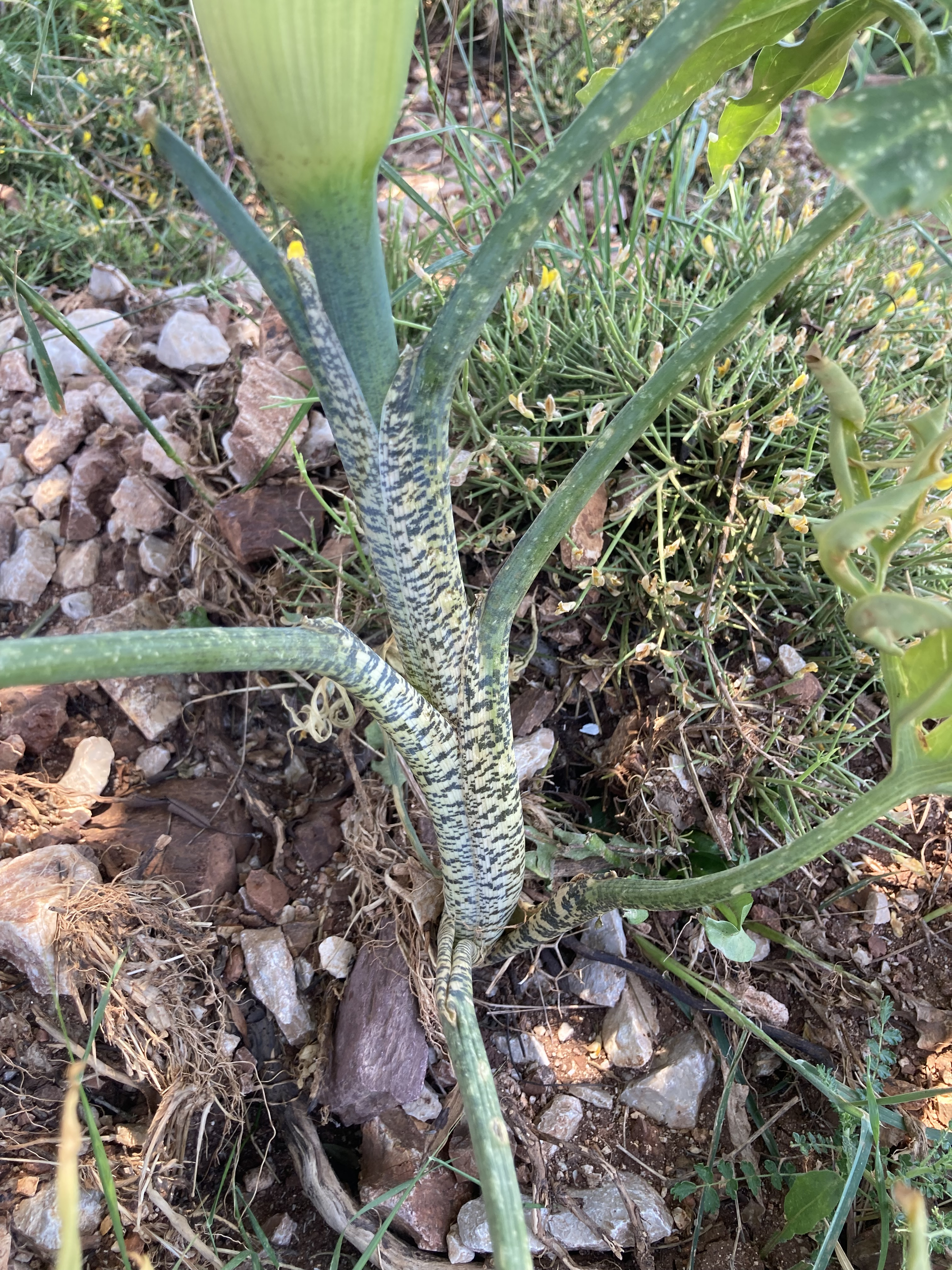
The mottled stem

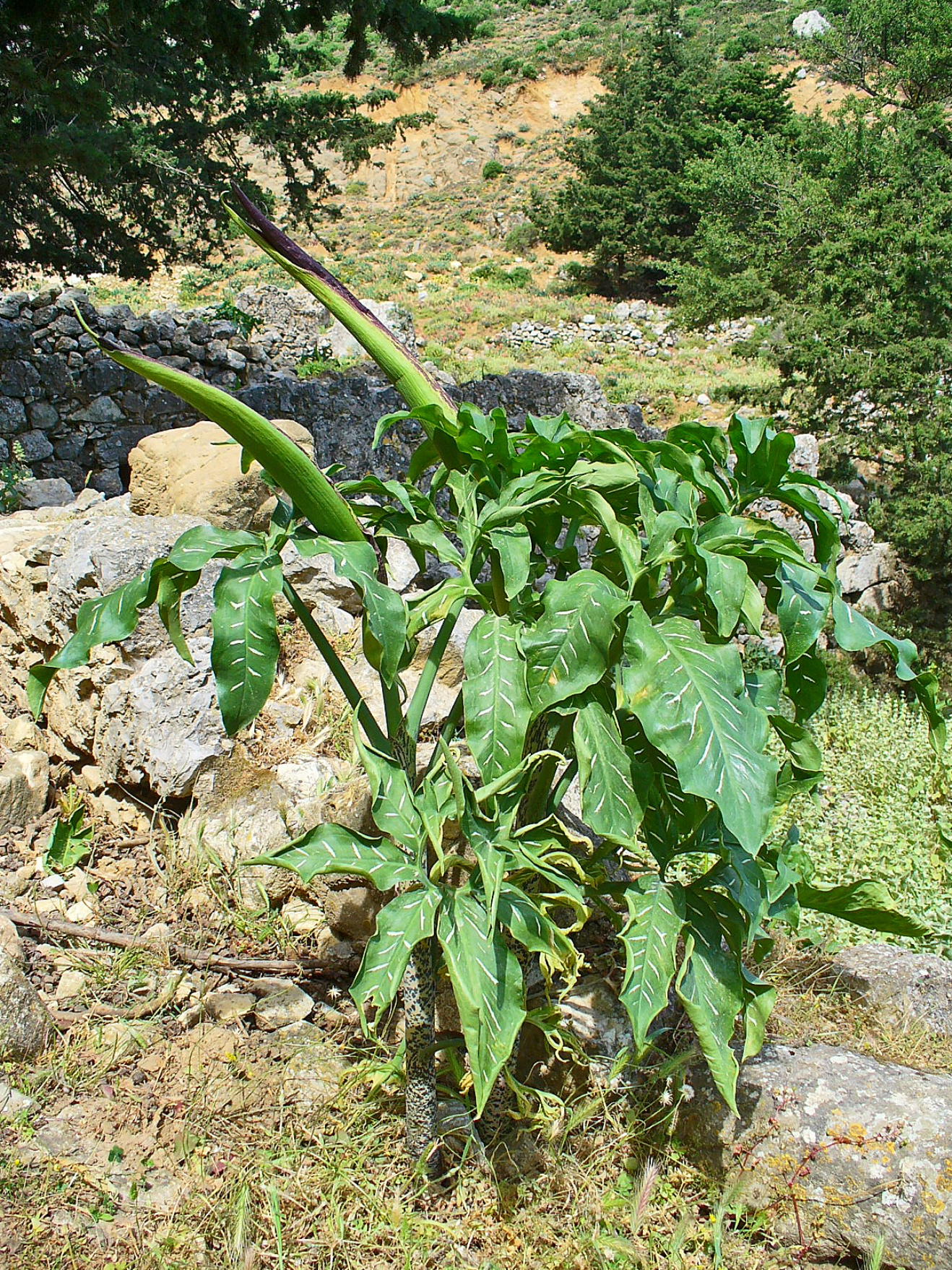
The leaves

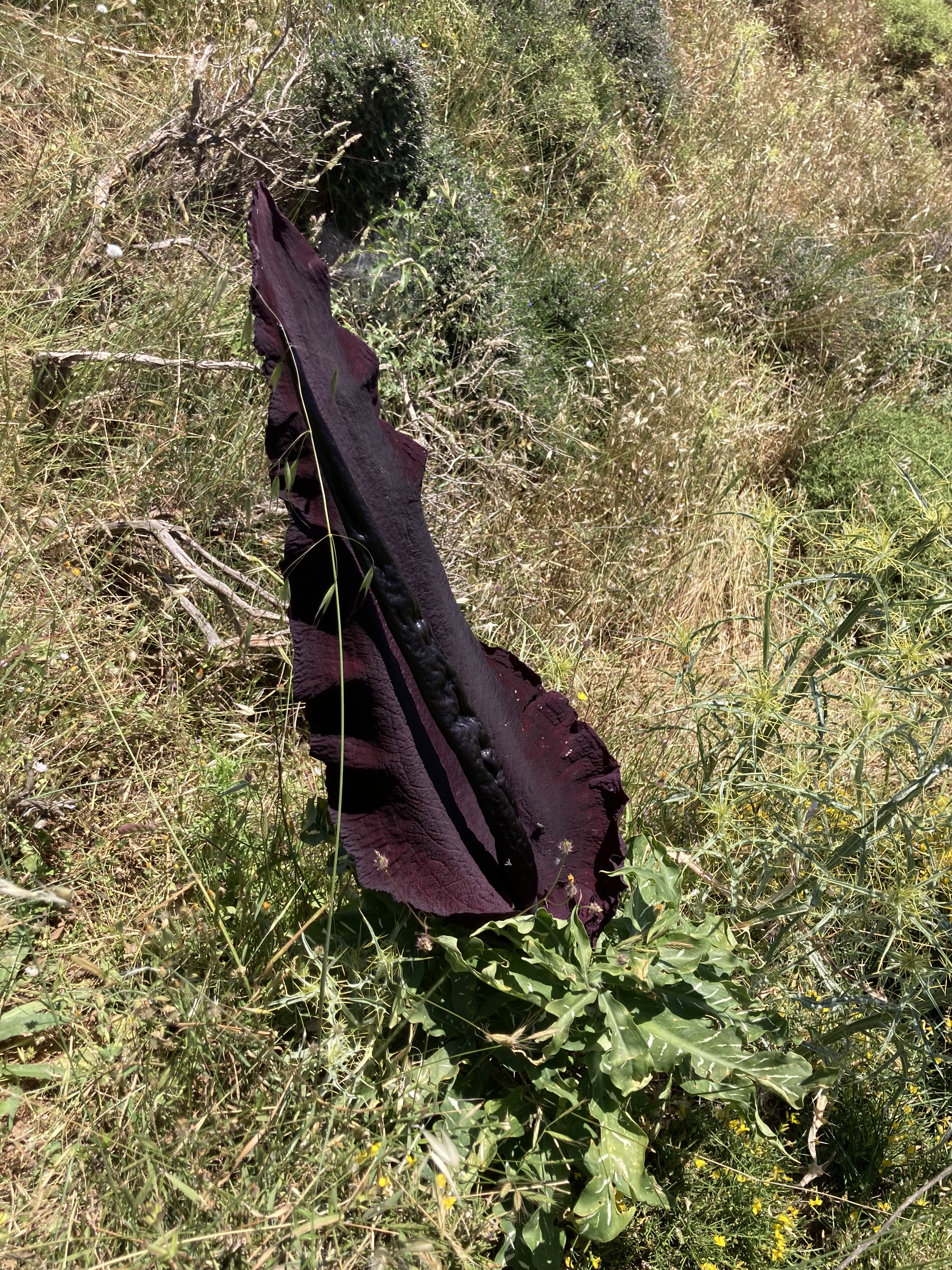
The mature infloresecence seen on Rhodes

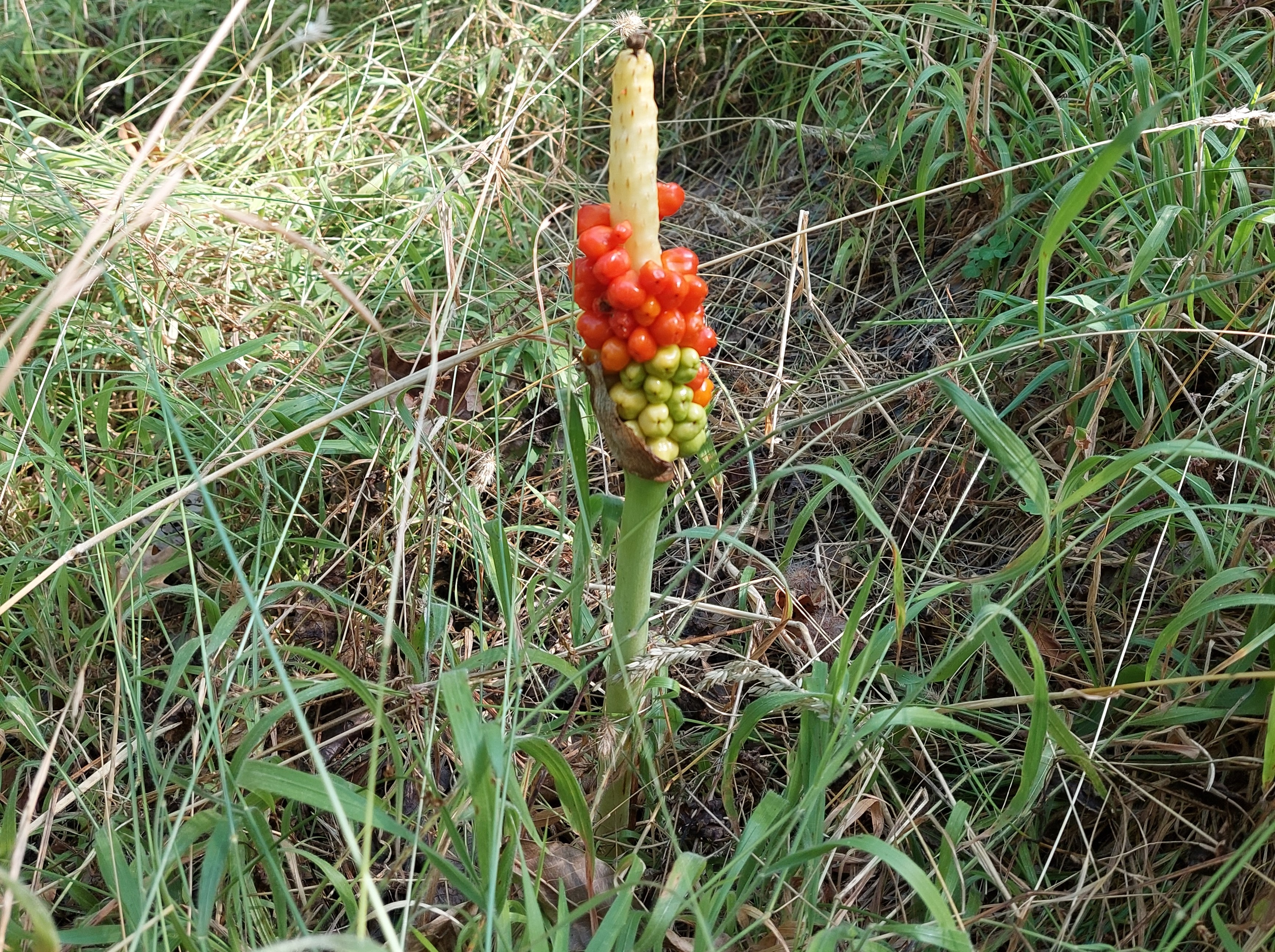
The fruit
