= Brachyorrhos gastrotaenius =

Conservation status
- Data Deficient (IUCN 3.1)

Scientific classification
- Kingdom: Animalia
- Phylum: Chordata
- Class: Reptilia
- Order: Squamata
- Suborder: Serpentes
- Family: Homalopsidae
- Genus: Brachyorrhos
- Species: B. gastrotaenius

Binomial name
- Brachyorrhos gastrotaenius (Bleeker, 1860)

Synonyms
- Rabdion gastrotaenia Bleeker, 1860 Brachyorrhos gastrotaenia Bleeker, 1860 Brachyorrhos fusiformis Fischer, 1879

Species of snake

Brachyorrhos gastrotaenius, commonly known as the Buru short-tailed snake, is a non-venomous, fangless species of homalopsid snake endemic to the island of Buru in Indonesia.
