= Brachyorrhos raffrayi =

Conservation status
- Data Deficient (IUCN 3.1)

Scientific classification
- Kingdom: Animalia
- Phylum: Chordata
- Class: Reptilia
- Order: Squamata
- Suborder: Serpentes
- Family: Homalopsidae
- Genus: Brachyorrhos
- Species: B. raffrayi

Binomial name
- Brachyorrhos raffrayi (Sauvage, 1879)

Synonyms
- Atractocephalus raffrayi Sauvage, 1879; Brachyorrhos albus conjunctus Fischer, 1880

Species of snake

Brachyorrhos raffrayi, commonly known as the ternate short-tailed snake, is a species of fangless homalopsid snake endemic to the island of Ternate in the Maluku Islands of eastern Indonesia.
