= Alexei Fedchenko =

Russian naturalist and explorer

Alexei Pavlovich Fedchenko
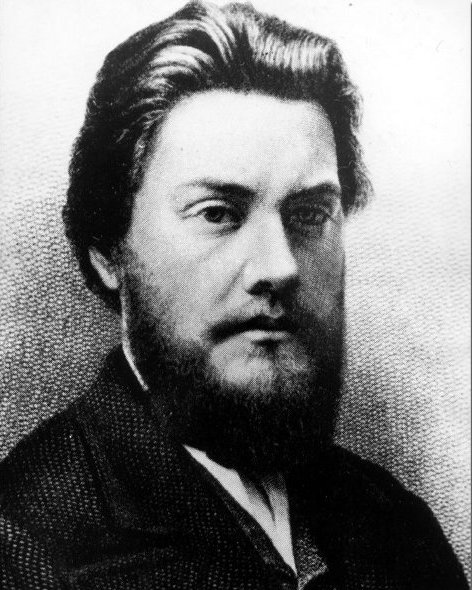
- Born: 7 February [O.S. 26 January] 1844; Irkutsk, Russian Empire
- Died: 31 August/15 September 1873 (aged 29); Mont Blanc, France
- Education: Moscow University
- Known for: Exploration of Turkestan
- Spouse: Olga Armfeldt (18??-1873; his death)
- Scientific career
- Fields: Biology, geography, exploration
- Author abbrev. (botany): A.Fedtsch.

Alexei Pavlovich Fedchenko (Russian: Алексей Павлович Федченко; 7 February [O.S. 26 January] 1844 – 31 August/15 September 1873), or Fedtschenko, was a Russian naturalist and explorer well known for his travels in central Asia. Alternative transliterations of his name, used in languages such as German, include Aleksei Pavlovich Fedtschenko and Alexei Pawlowitsch Fedtschenko.

== Biography ==
Fedchenko was born at Irkutsk, in Siberia, and after attending the gymnasium of his native town, proceeded to the University of Moscow, to study zoology and geology.

He married Olga Armfeldt, a botanist. In 1868, they travelled through Turkestan, Samarkand, Panjakent, and the upper Zarafshan River valley. In 1870, they explored the Fan Mountains south of the Zarafshan. In 1871, they reached the Alay Valley at Daroot-Korgan and saw the northern Pamir Mountains but were unable to penetrate southward.

He also collected significant numbers of insects from three explorations from 1869 to 1873. These were then studied by Ferdinand Morawitz in St Petersburg. He recorded 438 species belonging to 36 genera from Central Asia, 68 species of Andrena, 17 species from Europe, and 51 new species.

Soon after their return to Europe, he perished on Mont Blanc while engaged in a tour in France. He had been trying to look at glaciers in France to see how they compared with those in Turkestan. He was 29 years old. His widow had him buried in Chamonix.

After he died, his widow published his investigations and work, before she started re-exploring. She later worked with their son, Boris, but Olga remained an important botanist in her own right.

Alexei Fedchenko discovered the life cycle of Dracunculus which causes Dracunculiasis, more commonly known as Guinea worm disease (GWD). Accounts of the explorations and discoveries of Fedchenko were published by the Russian government: his Journeys in Turkestan in 1874, In the Khanat of Khokand in 1875, and Botanical Discoveries in 1876. See also Petermann's Mittheilungen (1872–1874).

The Fedchenko Glacier in the Pamirs is named after him, as is the asteroid 3195 Fedchenko.

The botanical epithets fedtschenkoi and fedtschenkoanus may each refer to either Alexei Fedtchenko, or his son Boris Fedtchenko. Primula fedtschenkoi (Regel) was named after him in 1875. Bambusa fecunda fedtschenkoi, may have been named after him, also a lacewing in 1875, Lopezus fedtschenkoi (MacLachlan). A species of gecko, Tenuidactylus fedtschenkoi, is named in his honor.

== Works ==
- 1875 Puteshestvie v Turkestan; zoogeographicheskia izledovania. Gos. izd-vo Geograficheskoi Literatury, Moskva.
