= Carabus akinini loudai =

Scientific classification
- Domain: Eukaryota
- Kingdom: Animalia
- Phylum: Arthropoda
- Class: Insecta
- Order: Coleoptera
- Suborder: Adephaga
- Family: Carabidae
- Genus: Carabus
- Species: C. akinini
- Subspecies: C. a. loudai

Trinomial name
- Carabus akinini loudai Gottwald, 1987

Subspecies of beetle

Carabus akinini loudai is a black-coloured subspecies of beetle from Carabidae, that is endemic to Kyrgyzstan. The males of the subspecies are ranging from 20–22 millimetres (0.79–0.87 in) long.
