= Chloropterus lefevrei =

Scientific classification
- Kingdom: Animalia
- Phylum: Arthropoda
- Clade: Pancrustacea
- Class: Insecta
- Order: Coleoptera
- Suborder: Polyphaga
- Infraorder: Cucujiformia
- Family: Chrysomelidae
- Genus: Chloropterus
- Species: C. lefevrei

Binomial name
- Chloropterus lefevrei Reitter, 1890

Synonyms
- Chloropterus nigrofasciatus Reitter, 1897; Chloropterus nigrofasciatus var. bipunctatus Reitter, 1897; Chloropterus nigrofasciatus var. bucharicus Reitter, 1897

Species of beetle

Chloropterus lefevrei is a species of leaf beetle distributed from the Caucasus via Central Asia to Western Asia. It was first described by Edmund Reitter in 1890, who named it after Édouard Lefèvre.

== Subspecies ==
There are two subspecies of C. lefevrei:

- Chloropterus lefevrei arabicus Lopatin, 2008: Found in the United Arab Emirates.
- Chloropterus lefevrei lefevrei Reitter, 1890: The nominotypical subspecies. Found in Azerbaijan, Iran, Iraq, Kazakhstan, Oman, Saudi Arabia, Tajikistan, Turkmenistan and Uzbekistan.
