= Chloropterus stigmaticollis =

Scientific classification
- Kingdom: Animalia
- Phylum: Arthropoda
- Clade: Pancrustacea
- Class: Insecta
- Order: Coleoptera
- Suborder: Polyphaga
- Infraorder: Cucujiformia
- Family: Chrysomelidae
- Genus: Chloropterus
- Species: C. stigmaticollis

Binomial name
- Chloropterus stigmaticollis Fairmaire, 1875

Species of beetle

Chloropterus stigmaticollis is a species of leaf beetle of Tunisia, described by Léon Fairmaire in 1875.
