= Carabus akinini buffi =

Scientific classification
- Domain: Eukaryota
- Kingdom: Animalia
- Phylum: Arthropoda
- Class: Insecta
- Order: Coleoptera
- Suborder: Adephaga
- Family: Carabidae
- Genus: Carabus
- Species: C. akinini
- Subspecies: C. a. buffi

Trinomial name
- Carabus akinini buffi Deuve & Kaláb, 1992

Subspecies of beetle

Carabus akinini buffi is a black-coloured subspecies of beetle from family Carabidae, endemic to Kyrgyzstan. The males of the subspecies are 18 millimetres (0.71 in) long.
