= Dracunculus canariensis =

Species of plant

Dracunculus canariensis is a plant belonging to the Dracunculus Genus and Araceae Family.

== Description ==
The plant's stem has a Palish green exterior whist the petals of the plant have a greenish white interior. The plant is able to produce up to 50 berries that go from a greenish color, to an orangish hue when ripe. The yellow stem, or spadix, uses a semen-like odor to attract flies, wasps, bees, and other insects for pollination of the spathe.

Dracunculus canariensis
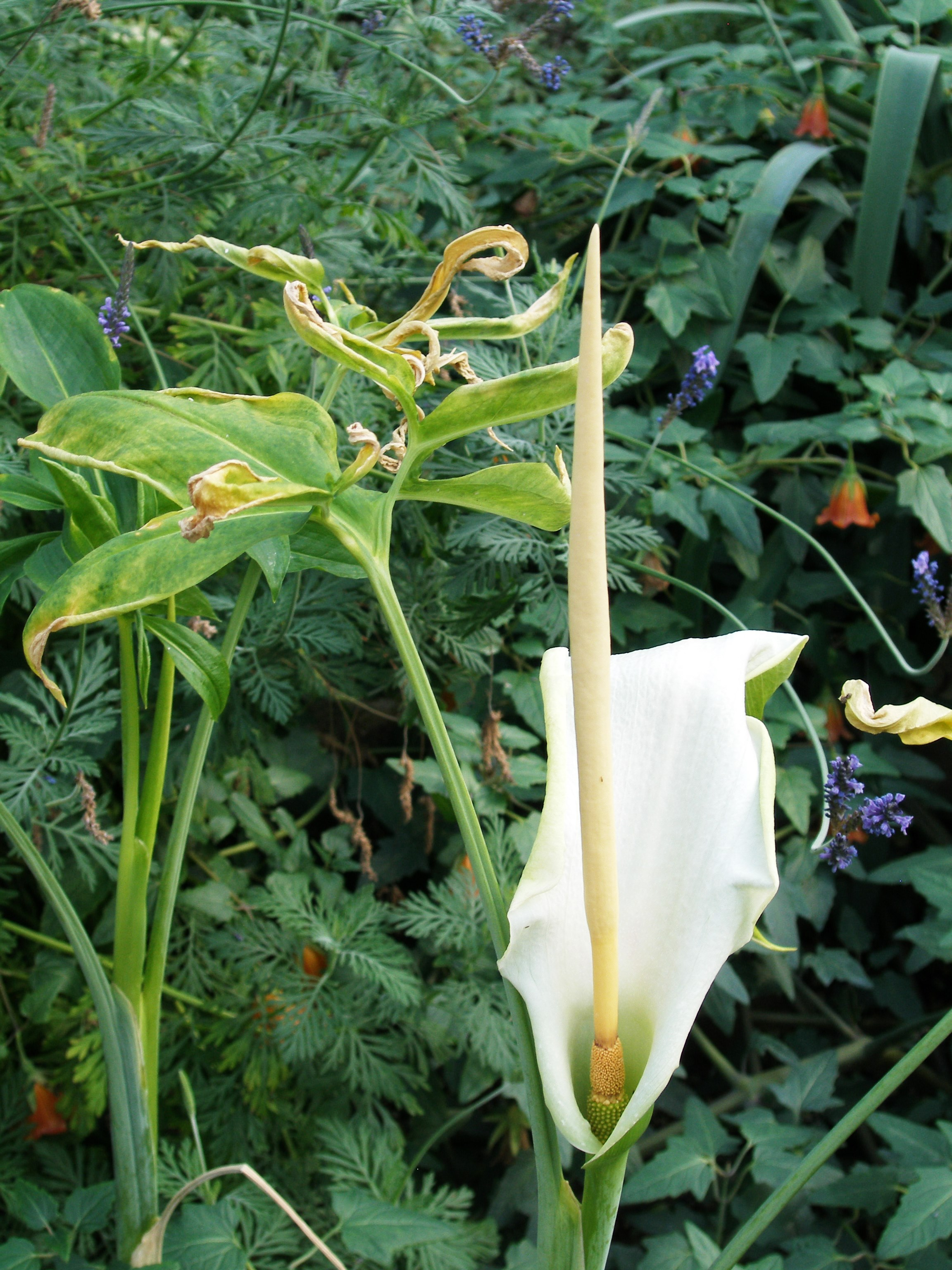

Scientific classification
- Kingdom: Plantae
- Clade: Tracheophytes
- Clade: Angiosperms
- Clade: Monocots
- Order: Alismatales
- Family: Araceae
- Genus: Dracunculus
- Species: D. canariensis

Binomial name
- Dracunculus canariensis Kunth (1841)

== Ecology ==
Dracunculus canariensis can be found solely in the Canary Islands: Gran Canaria, La Palma, Tenerife. It can be cultivated in Laurel forests, open, dry woodland, and scrubby fields.
