= Carabus akinini ketmenensis =

Scientific classification
- Domain: Eukaryota
- Kingdom: Animalia
- Phylum: Arthropoda
- Class: Insecta
- Order: Coleoptera
- Suborder: Adephaga
- Family: Carabidae
- Genus: Carabus
- Species: C. akinini
- Subspecies: C. a. ketmenensis

Trinomial name
- Carabus akinini ketmenensis Dolin, 1991

Subspecies of beetle

Carabus akinini ketmenensis is a black or brown-coloured subspecies of ground beetle from family Carabidae, that is endemic to Kazakhstan. The males of the subspecies are ranging from 20–22 millimetres (0.79–0.87 in) long.
