= Chloropterus politus =

Scientific classification
- Kingdom: Animalia
- Phylum: Arthropoda
- Clade: Pancrustacea
- Class: Insecta
- Order: Coleoptera
- Suborder: Polyphaga
- Infraorder: Cucujiformia
- Family: Chrysomelidae
- Genus: Chloropterus
- Species: C. politus

Binomial name
- Chloropterus politus Berti & Rapilly, 1973

Species of beetle

Chloropterus politus is a species of leaf beetle from Iran and Oman. It was first described from Minab by French entomologists Nicole Berti and Michel Rapilly in 1973.
