= Achille Raffray =

French diplomat, traveller, zoologist and entomologist

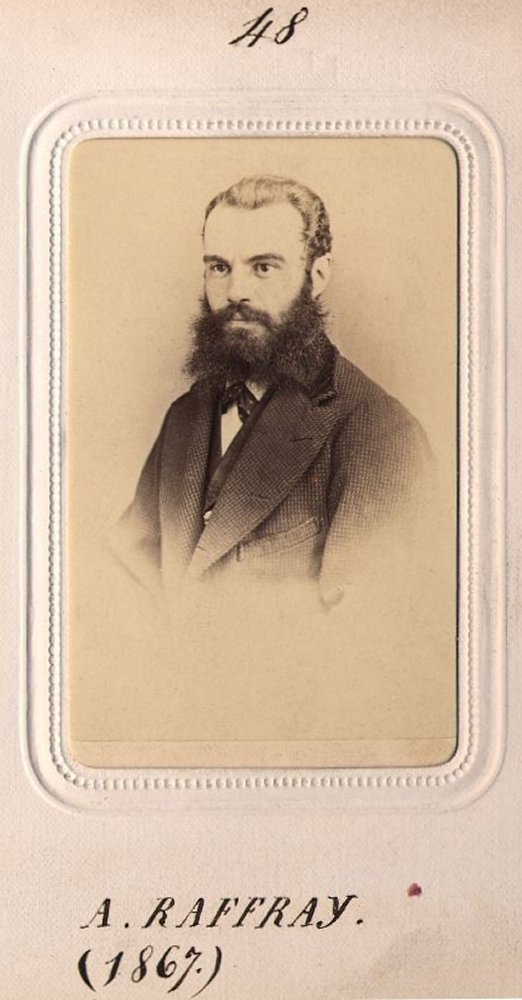
Achille Marie Jacques's Portrait

Achille Marie Jacques Raffray (17 October 1844 – 25 September 1923) was a French diplomat, traveller, zoologist and entomologist.

He wrote: (Partial list)

- Entomology:

- (1890) Étude sur le Psélaphides. V. Tableaux synoptiques. Notes et synonymie. Revue d'Entomologie, Caen, 9: 81–172.
- (1892) with Ignacio Bolívar and Eugène Simon. Voyage de M. E. Simon aux îles Philippines (Mars et Avril 1890). 4e mémoire. Etude sur les arthropodes cavernicoles de l'île de Luzon. Annales de la Société Entomologique de France 61: 27-52, Pl. 1-2.
- (1900) Australian Pselaphidae. Proceedings of the Linnean Society of New South Wales 25: 131–249, pl. 1
- (1904) Genera et catalogue des Psélaphides. Annales de la Société Entomologique de France 73: 1–400
- (1908) Coleoptera fam. Pselaphidae. pp. 1–487, pls i–ix in Wytsman, P. (ed.). Genera Insectorum, 64th fascicule. Rome : Wytsman.
- (1912) with Antoine Henri Grouvelle Supplément à la Liste des Coléoptères de la Guadeloupe Ann. Soc. Entom. France vol. 81

- Geography:

- (1875) 'Voyage en Abyssinie, à Zanzibar et au pays des Ouanika', Bulletin de la Société de Géographie x, No. 6

Achille Raffray was a member of the Société entomologique de France and the Société de Géographie. His massive collections of world beetles were sold and are conserved in many European museums.

== Eponyms ==
Raffray's bandicoot, Peroryctes raffrayana, was named for him by the Parisian zoologist Henri Milne-Edwards.

A species of African snake, Scaphiophis raffreyi, was named in his honor by French herpetologist Marie Firmin Bocourt, while a species of short-tailed snake, Brachyorrhos raffreyi from Ternate in North Maluku Province, Indonesia, was also named for Raffray, by the French herpetologist, ichthyologist and paleontologist Henri-Émile Sauvage

A longhorn beetle Brachyhammus raffrayi (Thomson, 1878) from Zanzibar was named in his honor by James Thomson, originally as Phryneta raffrayi.
