= Brachyorrhos wallacei =

Conservation status
- Data Deficient (IUCN 3.1)

Scientific classification
- Kingdom: Animalia
- Phylum: Chordata
- Order: Squamata
- Suborder: Serpentes
- Family: Homalopsidae
- Genus: Brachyorrhos
- Species: B. wallacei

Binomial name
- Brachyorrhos wallacei Murphy, Mumpuni, De Lang, Gower & Sanders, 2012

Species of snake

Brachyorrhos wallacei, commonly known as the Halmahera short-tailed snake, is a species of non-venomous, fangless snake belonging to the family Homalopsidae. It is endemic to the island of Halmahera in the Maluku Islands of Indonesia.
