= Chloropterus fiorii =

Scientific classification
- Kingdom: Animalia
- Phylum: Arthropoda
- Clade: Pancrustacea
- Class: Insecta
- Order: Coleoptera
- Suborder: Polyphaga
- Infraorder: Cucujiformia
- Family: Chrysomelidae
- Genus: Chloropterus
- Species: C. fiorii

Binomial name
- Chloropterus fiorii Ruffo, 1965

Species of beetle

Chloropterus fiorii is a species of leaf beetle of Libya, described by Sandro Ruffo in 1965.
