= Georg Hieronymus Welsch =

German physician and writer (1624-1677)

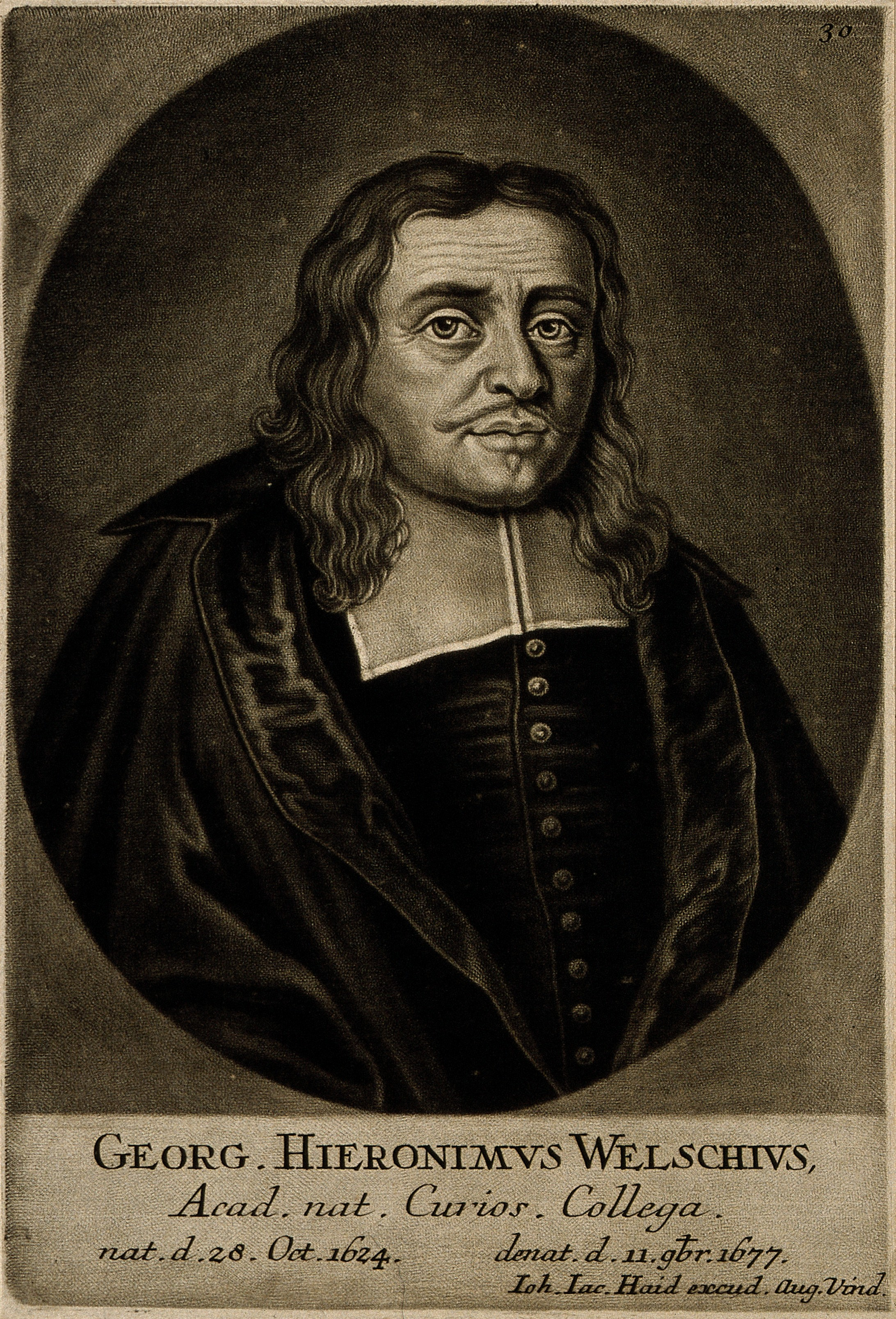

Georg Hieronymus Welsch (Latinized as Georgius Hieronymus Velschius; 28 October 1624 – 11 November 1677) was a German physician and writer who examined texts in astronomy and medicine from the Ottoman Empire.

Welsch was born in Augsburg where his father was an apothecary. He studied medicine at Tübingen, Strasburg and Padua before visiting Basel in 1645. He attempted to travel further but his parents forbade him. He attempted to return to Padua to obtain his physician degree but he was struck by epilepsy and was unable to speak thereafter. The then settled alone in Augsburg, surrounded by his books and read and wrote extensively. He knew Greek, Latin, Hebrew, and Arabic which he had studied in his home town. During his travels to Basel and Zurich where he studied the work of Conrad Gesner under Johann Heinrich Hottinger. He then travelled to Italy visiting numerous libraries including that of the Vatican. He collected books and pamphlets including a Turkish calendar. He wrote extensively on medicine in his manuscripts and published a few works including the methods of Ibn Sina. He described the surgical removal of guinea worms in his 1674 Exercitatio de vena Medinense, ad mentem Ebnsinae F. de dracunculis veterum. Another work was Desiderata Medicinae (1676) in which he listed out things he wished to know. A biography was written by his nephew Lucas Schroeck. He was made a member of the Leopoldina Academy in 1676.
