= Brachyorrhos =

Scientific classification
- Kingdom: Animalia
- Phylum: Chordata
- Class: Reptilia
- Order: Squamata
- Suborder: Serpentes
- Family: Homalopsidae
- Genus: Brachyorrhos; Kuhl in Schlegel, 1826

Type species
- Coluber albus Linnaeus, 1758

Genus of snakes

Brachyorrhos is a genus of snakes of the family Homalopsidae.

== Species ==
- Brachyorrhos albus (Linnaeus, 1758)
- Brachyorrhos gastrotaenius (Bleeker, 1860)
- Brachyorrhos pygmaeus Murphy & Voris, 2021
- Brachyorrhos raffrayi (Sauvage, 1879)
- Brachyorrhos wallacei Murphy, Mumpuni, de Lang, Gower & Sanders, 2012
