= Brachyhammus =

Scientific classification
- Kingdom: Animalia
- Phylum: Arthropoda
- Class: Insecta
- Order: Coleoptera
- Suborder: Polyphaga
- Infraorder: Cucujiformia
- Family: Cerambycidae
- Genus: Brachyhammus
- Species: B. raffrayi

Binomial name
- Brachyhammus raffrayi (Thomson, 1878)

Genus of beetles

Brachyhammus raffrayi is a species of beetle in the family Cerambycidae, and the only species in the genus Brachyhammus. It was described by Thomson in 1878.

== Nomenclature ==
Note, the original spelling is Phryneta raffrayi Thomson, 1878, therefore in later combination it is Brachyhammus raffrayi (Thomson, 1878), not the alternative spelling of the species epithet that has been misused in many biodiversity databases.
