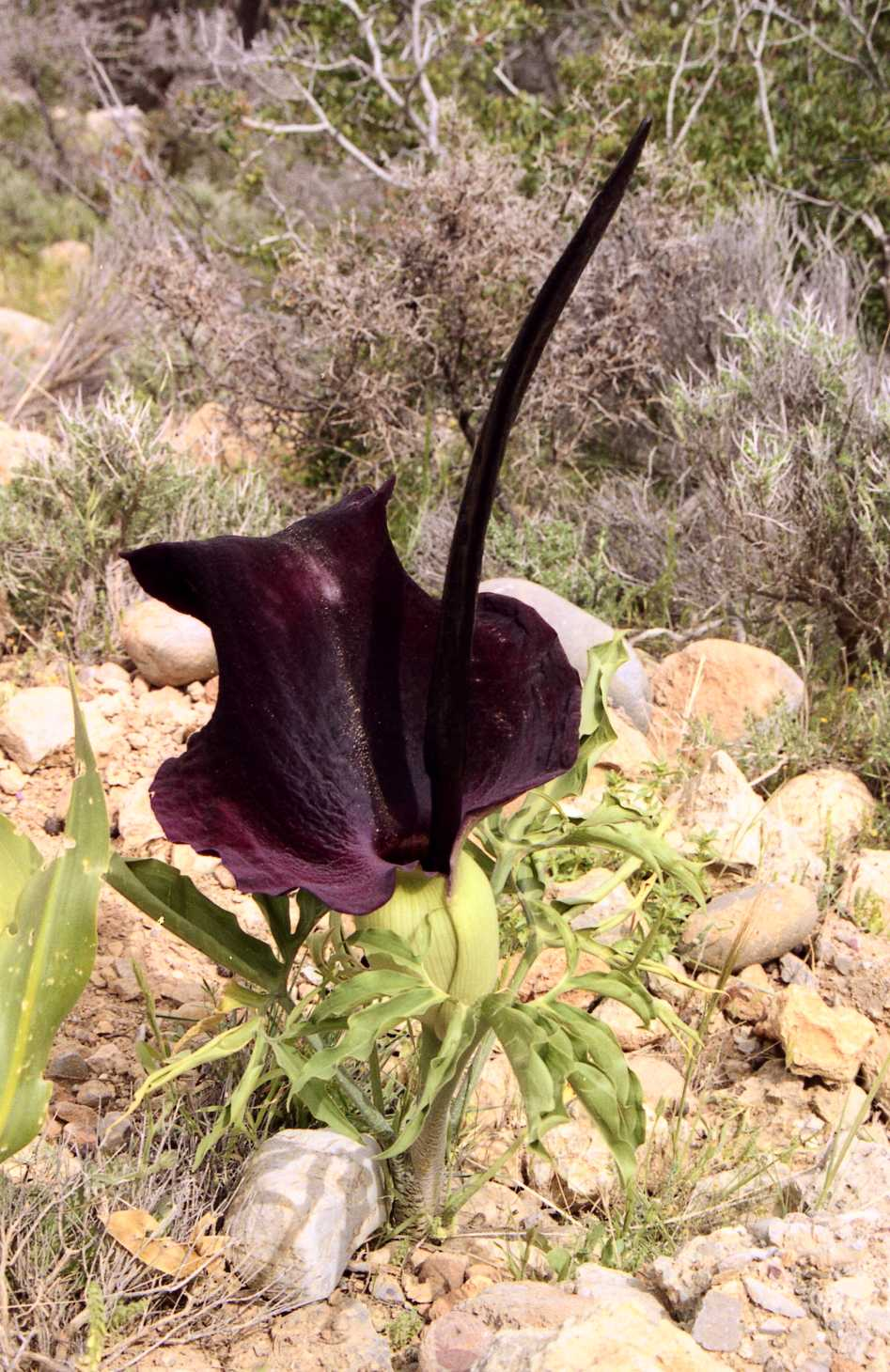
- Dracunculus vulgaris

Scientific classification
- Kingdom: Plantae
- Clade: Embryophytes
- Clade: Tracheophytes
- Clade: Angiosperms
- Clade: Monocots
- Order: Alismatales
- Family: Araceae
- Subfamily: Aroideae
- Tribe: Areae
- Genus: Dracunculus; Mill.

Type species
- Dracunculus vulgaris

Species
- Dracunculus canariensis; Dracunculus vulgaris

Synonyms
- Anarmodium Schott

= Dracunculus (plant) =

Genus of flowering plants

Dracunculus is a genus of two species of a tuberous perennial of the family Araceae. They are characterised by a large purple spathe and spadix, often produced in advance of the pedate, dark green leaves often with white mottling. The open spathe is usually accompanied by a foul smell.

The best known species is Dracunculus vulgaris, which is sometimes grown in gardens for ornamental purposes.

They are native to the Mediterranean, Madeira and the Canary Islands where they are found in rocky areas, hillsides and waste ground.

== Species ==
Image	Scientific name	Distribution
	Dracunculus canariensis Kunth	Canary Islands, Madeira
	Dracunculus vulgaris Schott	Turkey, Algeria, southern Europe (Spain, Italy, Portugal, France, Yugoslavia, Albania, Greece, Bulgaria); naturalized in scattered locations in the United States
