= Alfred Chobaut =

French physician and entomologist

Alfred Chobaut (19 October 1860 – 3 February 1926) was a French physician and entomologist. He collected especially beetles from Europe and northern Africa and described many new species. His son Hyacinthe Chobaut (1889-1950) was a noted archivist.

Chobaut was born in Salins and was educated at the Lycée d'Avignon and Lycée de Tournon before going to Lyon to study medicine. His thesis was on anterior tarsectomy. He married in 1888 and settled at Avignon. He became a member of the Entomological Society of France and the Academy of Vaucluse. Along with Dr Jacquet he collected in the Mont Pilat and in Ain. Chobaut took a special interest in the beetles of the families Mordellidae, Rhipiphoridae, Histeridae and Anthicidae. Chobaut was among the first to note the attraction of anthicids to meloids, suggesting that cantharidin might play a role. He also collected Lepidoptera and other groups. He took an interest in plants and made watercolour illustrations of montane plants of the Ventoux region. He collected especially by beating and use of an umbrella. From 1893 to 1902 he collected in north Africa each year. In 1916 he had a bladder stone that needed a surgery followed by a kidney stone that also needed surgery. His health then began to worsen and he gave up his medical practice and was involved in the study of beetles until his death.
