= Hard tissue =

Mineralized body tissue

Hard tissue, referring to "normal" calcified tissue, is tissue which is mineralized and has a firm intercellular matrix. The hard tissues of humans are bone, tooth enamel, dentin, and cementum. The term is in contrast to soft tissue.

== Bone ==
Bone is a rigid organ that constitutes part of the vertebral skeleton. Bones support and protect the various organs of the body, produce red and white blood cells, store minerals and also enable mobility. Bone tissue is a type of dense connective tissue. Bones come in a variety of shapes and sizes and have a complex internal and external structure. They are lightweight yet strong and hard, and serve multiple functions. Mineralized osseous tissue or bone tissue, is of two types – cortical and cancellous and gives it rigidity and a coral-like three-dimensional internal structure. Other types of tissue found in bones include marrow, endosteum, periosteum, nerves, blood vessels and cartilage.

Bone is an active tissue composed of different cells. Osteoblasts are involved in the creation and mineralisation of bone; osteocytes and osteoclasts are involved in the reabsorption of bone tissue. The mineralised matrix of bone tissue has an organic component mainly of collagen and an inorganic component of bone mineral made up of various salts.

== Enamel ==
Enamel is the hardest substance in the human body and contains the highest percentage of minerals, 96%, with water and organic material composing the rest. The primary mineral is hydroxyapatite, which is a crystalline calcium phosphate. Enamel is formed on the tooth while the tooth is developing within the gum, before it erupts into the mouth. Once fully formed, it does not contain blood vessels or nerves. Remineralisation of teeth can repair damage to the tooth to a certain degree but damage beyond that cannot be repaired by the body. The maintenance and repair of human tooth enamel is one of the primary concerns of dentistry.

In humans, enamel varies in thickness over the surface of the tooth, often thickest at the cusp, up to 2.5 mm, and thinnest at its border with the cementum at the cementoenamel junction.

The normal color of enamel varies from light yellow to grayish (bluish) white. At the edges of teeth where there is no dentin underlying the enamel, the color sometimes has a slightly blue tone. Since enamel is semitranslucent, the color of dentin and any material underneath the enamel strongly affects the appearance of a tooth. The enamel on primary teeth has a more opaque crystalline form and thus appears whiter than on permanent teeth.

The large amount of mineral in enamel accounts not only for its strength but also for its brittleness. Tooth enamel ranks 5 on Mohs hardness scale and has a Young's modulus of 83 GPa. Dentin, less mineralized and less brittle, 3–4 in hardness, compensates for enamel and is necessary as a support. On radiographs, the differences in the mineralization of different parts of the tooth and surrounding periodontium can be noted; enamel appears lighter than dentin or pulp since it is denser than both and more radiopaque.

Enamel does not contain collagen, as found in other hard tissues such as dentin and bone, but it does contain two unique classes of proteins: amelogenins and enamelins. While the role of these proteins is not fully understood, it is believed that they aid in the development of enamel by serving as a framework for minerals to form on, among other functions. Once it is mature, enamel is almost totally without the softer organic matter. Enamel is avascular and has no nerve supply within it and is not renewed, however, it is not a static tissue as it can undergo mineralization changes.

== Dentin ==
By weight, 70% of dentin consists of the mineral hydroxyapatite, 20% is organic material, and 10% is water. Yellow in appearance, it greatly affects the color of a tooth due to the translucency of enamel. Dentin, which is less mineralized and less brittle than enamel, is necessary for the support of enamel. Dentin rates approximately 3 on the Mohs scale of mineral hardness.

== Cementum ==
Cementum is slightly softer than dentin and consists of about 45% to 50% inorganic material (hydroxyapatite) by weight and 50% to 55% organic matter and water by weight. The organic portion is composed primarily of collagen and proteoglycans. Cementum is avascular, receiving its nutrition through its own imbedded cells from the surrounding vascular periodontal ligament.

The cementum is light yellow and slightly lighter in color than dentin. It has the highest fluoride content of all mineralized tissue. Cementum also is permeable to a variety of materials. It is formed continuously throughout life because a new layer of cementum is deposited to keep the attachment intact as the superficial layer of cementum ages. Cementum on the root ends surrounds the apical foramen and may extend slightly onto the inner wall of the pulp canal.
