= Ferdinand Morawitz =

Russian entomologist (1827–1896)

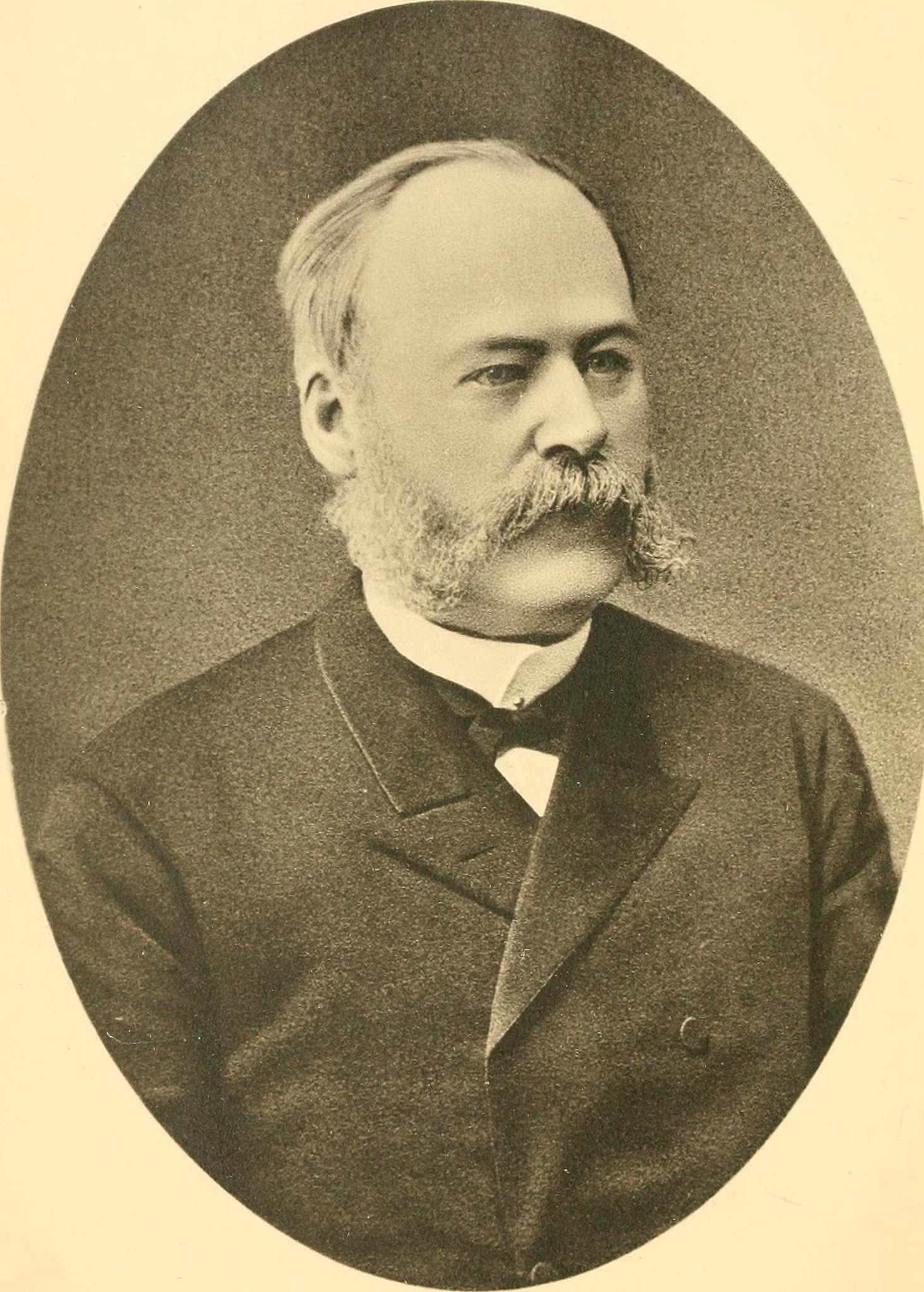
- Born: 3 August 1827
- Died: 5 December 1896 (aged 69)
- Education: Tartu University
- Known for: work on insects of Central Asia
- Scientific career
- Fields: entomology

Ferdinand Ferdinandovich Morawitz (Russian: Фердинанд Фердинандович Моравиц; German: Ferdinand Carl Joseph Morawitz; 3 August 1827 in St. Petersburg – 5 December 1896 in St. Petersburg) was a Russian entomologist.

== Life ==
His parents were German emigrants from Silesia. He was brought up in a private school for boys. In 1853, Morawitz graduated from the Dorpat University (now Tartu University), Estonia with a 'Doctor of Medicine' degree. With a final year dissertation on the anatomy of Blatta germanica. After he graduated, he moved to St Petersburg. He then had a Doctors practise for 15 years until 1879.

But in his spare time he was interested in entomology. He was one of the founding members of the Russian Entomological Society in 1859. He first published scientific work on Coleoptera in 1860.

Morawitz also studied the collection of naturalist Alexei Pavlovich Fedchenko, who had collected significant numbers of insects from three explorations from 1869 to 1873 of Central Asia. He recorded 438 species belonging to 36 genera from Central Asia: 68 species of Andrena, 17 species from Europe and 51 new species.

Dr. Ferdinand Morawitz worked mainly on Hymenoptera. He is best known for his work on the bees of Russia and Central Asia. He was one of the prominent entomologists associated with the Zoological Museum of the Russian Academy of Science where his brother August Feodorovitsh Morawitz was curator of the insect collections. His collection is shared between the Zoological Museum in St. Petersburg and the Zoological Museum of Odessa University.

== Works ==
Partial list

- 1869 Die Bienen des Gouvernements von St. Petersburg. Trudy Russkago éntomologicheskago obshchestva 6: 27-71.
- 1874 Die Bienen Daghestans. Trudy Russkago éntomologicheskago obshchestva 10(1873): 129-189.
- 1875 [Bees] (Mellifera) in A. Fedtschenko Reise in Turkestan. Berlin.
- 1880 Ein Beitrag zur Bienen-Fauna mittel-Asiens. Izvêstiya Imperatorskoi akademii nauk 26: 337-379.
- 1881 Die russischen Bombus-Arten in der Sammlung der Kaiserlichen Academie der Wissenschaften. Izvêstiya Imperatorskoi akademii nauk 27: 213-265.
- 1883 Neue russisch-asiatische Bombus-Arten. Trudy Russkago éntomologicheskago obshchestva 17: 235-245.
- 1886 Insecta in itinere cl. N. Przewalskii in Asia centrali novissime lecta. I. Apidae. Trudy Russkago éntomologicheskago obshchestva 20: 195-229.
- 1888 Hymenoptera aculeata nova. Descripsit. Trudy Russkago éntomologicheskago obshchestva 22: 224-302.
- 1890 Insecta a Cl. G. N. Potanin in China et in Mongolia novissime lecta. XIV. Hymenoptera Aculeata. II). III. Apidae. Trudy Russkago éntomologicheskago obshchestva 24: 349-385.
- 1891 Hymenoptera aculeata Rossica nova. Trudy Russkago éntomologicheskago obshchestva 26(1892): 132-181.
- 1893 Supplement zur Bienenfauna Turkestans. Trudy Russkago éntomologicheskago obshchestva 28(1894): 1-87.

== Sources ==
- "Моравиц, Фердинанд Фердинандович" . Brockhaus and Efron Encyclopedic Dictionary (in Russian). 1906.
- Meldola, R. 1896 Proc. Ent. Soc. London 1896 XCV.
- Pesenko, Yu. A. & Astafurova, Yu. V. 2003 Annotated Bibliography of Russian and Soviet Publications on the Bees 1771 - 2002 (Hymenoptera: Apoidea; excluding Apis mellifera).Denisia 11 1-616 (533-534).
- Baker, D. B., 2004 Type material of Hymenoptera described by O. L. Radoszkowsky in the Natural History Museum, London, and the localities of A. P. Fedtschencko's Reise in Turkestan Dt. ent. Zeitschr. 51, 231-252.
