= Dracunculidae =

Scientific classification
- Domain: Eukaryota
- Kingdom: Animalia
- Phylum: Nematoda
- Class: Secernentea
- Order: Camallanida
- Family: Dracunculidae

Family of roundworms

Dracunculidae is a family of parasitic nematodes belonging to the order Camallanida. All Dracunculidae are obligate tissue parasites of reptiles, birds, or mammals.

Genera:

- Avioserpens Wehr & Chitwood, 1934
- Dracunculus Reichard, 1759
- Lockenloia Adamson & Caira, 1991
