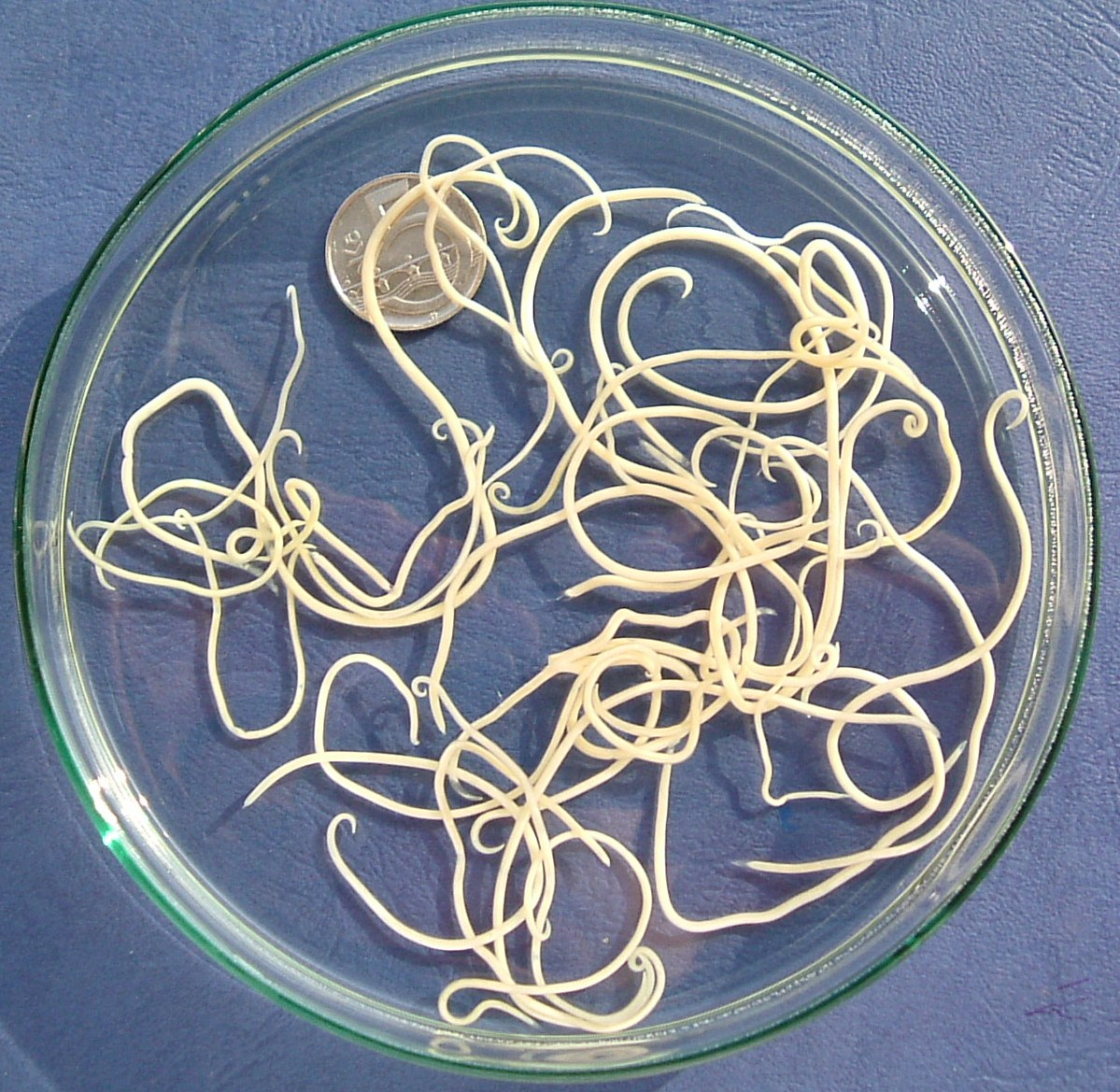
- Adult Toxocara canis (Ascaridoidea: Toxocaridae)

Scientific classification
- Kingdom: Animalia
- Phylum: Nematoda
- Class: Chromadorea
- Order: Ascaridida
- Suborder: Ascaridina

Superfamilies
- 5, see text

= Ascaridina =

Suborder of roundworms

The suborder Ascaridina contains the bulk of the Ascaridida, parasitic roundworms with three "lips" on the anterior end. The Ascaridida were formerly placed in the subclass Rhabditia by some, but morphological and DNA sequence data rather unequivocally assigns them to the Spiruria. The Oxyurida and Rhigonematida are occasionally placed in the Ascaridina as superfamily Oxyuroidea, but while they seem indeed to be Spiruria, they are not as close to Ascaris as such a treatment would place them.

These "worms" contain a number of important parasites of humans and domestic animals, namely in the superfamily Ascaridoidea.

== Fossil record ==
Some paleoparasitological studies have described groups belonging to Ascaridina infecting fish, reptiles, and mammals in the Mesozoic. Ascaridoids are known from coprolitic evidence to have infected crocodyliforms in the Late Cretaceous of Brazil.

== Systematics ==
The Ascaridina contain the following superfamilies and families:

Superfamily Ascaridoidea

- Acanthocheilidae
- Anisakidae
- Ascarididae
- Crossophoridae
- Goeziidae
- Raphidascarididae (disputed)
- Toxocaridae

Superfamily Cosmocercoidea

- Atractidae
- Cosmocercidae
- Kathlaniidae

Superfamily Heterakoidea

- Ascaridiidae
- Aspidoderidae (disputed)
- Heterakidae

Superfamily Seuratoidea

- Chitwoodchabaudiidae (disputed)
- Cucullanidae
- Quimperiidae
- Schneidernematidae
- Seuratidae

Superfamily Subuluroidea

- Maupasinidae
- Subuluridae
