= M. bicornis =

M. bicornis may refer to:

- Myleusnema bicornis, an intestinal parasite species of Myleus ternetzi, a freshwater fish commonly found in the French Guiana river
- Matthiola bicornis, a synonym for Matthiola longipetala, the evening stock, a flowering plant species
