= Cosmocerca =

Scientific classification
- Kingdom: Animalia
- Phylum: Nematoda
- Class: Chromadorea
- Order: Rhabditida
- Family: Cosmocercidae
- Genus: Cosmocerca; Diesing, 1861

Genus of nematodes

Cosmocerca is a genus of nematodes belonging to the family Cosmocercidae.

The genus has cosmopolitan distribution.

== Species ==
The following species are assigned to the genus Cosmocerca:

- Cosmocerca acanthurum
- Cosmocerca albopuntata
- Cosmocerca archeyi
- Cosmocerca ansansolensis
- Cosmocerca australis
- Cosmocerca banyulensis
- Cosmocerca bengalensis
- Cosmocerca brasiliensis
- Cosmocerca cajamarquensis
- Cosmocerca chilensis
- Cosmocerca colimense
- Cosmocerca commutata
- Cosmocerca cruzi
- Cosmocerca daly
- Cosmocerca goroensis
- Cosmocerca gymnophthalmicola
- Cosmocerca ishaqui
- Cosmocerca japonica
- Cosmocerca kalesari
- Cosmocerca leytensis
- Cosmocerca longicauda
- Cosmocerca longispicula
- Cosmocerca lymnodynastes
- Cosmocerca makhadoensis
- Cosmocerca microhylae
- Cosmocerca monicae
- Cosmocerca multipapillata
- Cosmocerca novaeguineae
- Cosmocerca ornata
- Cosmocerca oroensis
- Cosmocerca paraguayensis
- Cosmocerca parva
- Cosmocerca podicipinus
- Cosmocerca rara
- Cosmocerca sardiniae
- Cosmocerca similis
- Cosmocerca travassosi
- Cosmocerca tyleri
- Cosmocerca uruguayensis
- Cosmocerca vrcibradici
- Cosmocerca wichiorum
- Cosmocerca zugi
