= Cyrtosomum penneri =

Scientific classification
- Kingdom: Animalia
- Phylum: Nematoda
- Class: Chromadorea
- Order: Rhabditida
- Family: Atractidae
- Genus: Cyrtosomum
- Species: C. penneri

Binomial name
- Cyrtosomum penneri Gambino, 1957

Species of worm

Cyrtosomum penneri are roundworms of the family Atractidae that are found in the intestines or lungs of various vertebrate animals. They do not produce eggs; instead the adults produce larvae that are ready to infect as soon as they leave their mother's womb. C. penneri is found only in Mexico.

== Transmission ==
Unlike most nematodes, which infect their host by being accidentally swallowed, C. penneri is acquired through sexual transmission. In lizards, it is passed through the cloaca of the infected lizard to the cloaca of the other during mating, and it has been found, through experiments, that female contraction is 100% percent, while male contraction is about 70%. In an experiment by the Department of Biology at Florida Southern College, the researchers found that land snails and crickets do not serve as transport or intermediate hosts, which supports the idea that C. penneri is transferred only during sexual intercourse of the definitive host.
