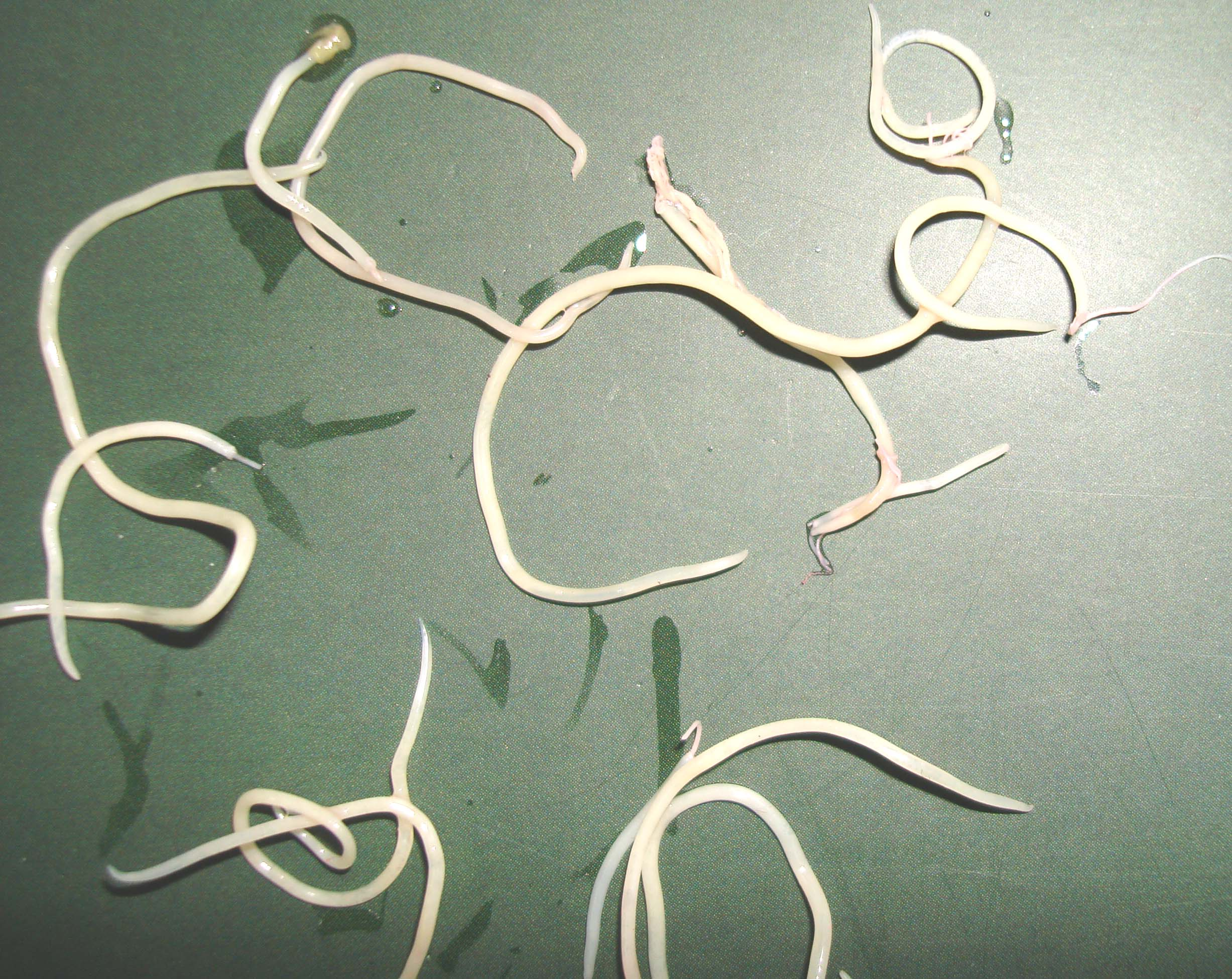
- Adult worms

Scientific classification
- Kingdom: Animalia
- Phylum: Nematoda
- Class: Chromadorea
- Order: Ascaridida
- Family: Ascaridiidae
- Genus: Ascaridia
- Species: A. galli

Binomial name
- Ascaridia galli Schrank, 1788

= Ascaridia galli =

Species of roundworm

Ascaridia galli is a parasitic roundworm belonging to the phylum Nematoda. Nematodes of the genus Ascaridia are essentially intestinal parasites of birds. A. galli is the most prevalent and pathogenic species, especially in domestic fowl, Gallus domesticus. It causes ascaridiasis, a disease of poultry due to heavy worm infection, particularly in chickens and turkeys. It inhabits the small intestine, and can be occasionally seen in commercial eggs.

== Description ==
It is the largest nematode in birds, with females measuring 72 to 112 mm long. The body is semitransparent, creamy-white, and cylindrical. The anterior end is characterized by a prominent mouth, which is surrounded by three large, trilobed lips. The edges of the lips bear teeth-like denticles. The body is entirely covered with a thick proteinaceous structure called cuticle. The cuticle is striated transversely through the length of the body and cuticular alae are poorly developed. Two conspicuous papillae are situated on the dorsal lip and one on each of the subventral lips. These papillae are the sensory organs of the nematode. A. galli is diecious with distinct sexual dimorphism. Females are considerably longer and more robust, with a vulva opening at the middle portion (roughly midway from anterior and posterior ends) of the body and anus at the posterior end of the body. The tail end of females is characteristically blunt and straight. Males are relatively shorter and smaller (measuring 50 to 76 mm long), with a distinct pointed and curved tail. Ten pairs of caudal papillae are found towards the tail region of the body, and they are arranged linearly in well-defined groups such as precloacal (three pairs), cloacal (one pair), postcloacal (one pair), and subterminal (three pairs) papillae. Eggs found in the feces of infected birds are oval with smooth shells and measure 73–92 by 45–57 microns.

== Life cycle ==
The lifecycle of A. galli is direct in a single host, involving two principal populations, namely the sexually mature parasite in the gastrointestinal tract and the infective stage (L2). The eggs are oval in shape and have thick, albuminous shells that are highly resistant to desiccation and persist for a long time in the environment. Larvae do not hatch, but moult inside the eggs until they reach the L2 stage. This can take about two weeks, but the period depends on other factors such as the weather condition. The lifecycle is completed when the infective eggs are ingested by new hosts through contaminated water or feed. The eggs containing the L2-larvae-passive are mechanically transported to the duodenum, where they molt and become larvae stage 3 and then larvae stage 4. The infective eggs are ingested by a chicken; when it reaches the proventriculus, it hatches. Temperature, carbon dioxide levels, and pH are thought to be triggering factors that signal the larva to hatch from its egg. The larva then burrows into the mucosal lining of the small intestine, where it undergoes two additional molts. In this phase of their lifecycle, these worms cause the most damage to their hosts. They then re-enter the small intestine and develop into adults, where they live their lives out feeding on gut content and making a vast number of eggs that would then be excreted by a host and free to continue their lifecycle. If the animal is able to mount an immune response to the larvae, i.e. from pre-exposure, the larvae do not develop into adults, but hide in the mucosa of the small intestine. This is common for infection of older birds. Transport hosts such as earthworms are thought to play a role in transmission of A. galli, hence free range birds tend to have a higher risk of infection.

== Pathogenicity ==
The nematode infects fowl of all ages, but the greatest degree of damage is often found in birds under 12 weeks of age. Heavy infection is the major cause of weight depression and reduced egg production in poultry husbandry. In severe infections, intestinal blockage can occur and causing haemorrhagic enteritis. Unthriftiness, drooping of the wings, bleaching of the head, and emaciation are seen. Infection also causes loss of blood, reduced blood sugar content, increased urates, shrunken thymus glands, retarded growth, and greatly increased mortality. In heavy infections, adult worms may move up the oviduct and be found in hens' eggs, and sometimes they are also found in the birds' feces.

== Treatment ==
Piperazine is the drug of choice. Continuous medication in feed with hygromycin B is also widely employed. Piperazine may be administered to chickens in the feed (0.2-0.4%) or water (0.1-0.2%), or as a single treatment (50–100 mg/bird). However, piperazine is quite ineffective for young chickens, while tetramisole is 89-100% effective for chicken of different ages. More recent drugs such as albendazole and levamisole are also highly effective. Fenbendazole is also very effective, 99.2-100% and 69.0-89.6% effective at administration doses of 60.6 ppm and 30.3 ppm. Ivermectin was also demonstrated to be 90 and 95% effective against immature and adult worms, respectively.
