= Cosmocerca commutata =

Scientific classification
- Kingdom: Animalia
- Phylum: Nematoda
- Class: Chromadorea
- Order: Rhabditida
- Family: Cosmocercidae
- Genus: Cosmocerca
- Species: C. commutata

Binomial name
- Cosmocerca commutata (Diesing, 1851)

Synonyms
- List: Ascaris commutata Diesing, 1851

Species of nematode worm

Cosmocerca commutata is a species of nematode worm belonging to the family Cosmocercidae.
