= Falcaustra tannaensis =

Scientific classification
- Domain: Eukaryota
- Kingdom: Animalia
- Phylum: Nematoda
- Class: Chromadorea
- Order: Rhabditida
- Family: Kathlaniidae
- Genus: Falcaustra
- Species: F. tannaensis

Binomial name
- Falcaustra tannaensis Bursey et al., 2010

Species of roundworm

Falcaustra tannaensis is the 87th discovered species of the nematode genus Falcaustra. It has been identified in geckos from Tanna Island, Vanuatu. Species of Falcaustra have been known parasites that occur in the digestive tracts of fish, amphibians, and mammals. Until 2010, none had ever been identified in the South Pacific Islands.

Falcaustra tannaensis is a nematode with a cylindrical body tapering anteriorly and posteriorly. It has a thin cuticle with fine, regular striations. Mouth opening is triangular, surrounded by 3 large lips, each with 2 papillai, amphidial pore at lateral edge of each subventral lip. Its lip support is lightly sclerotized. Cervical papillae slightly posterior to nerve ring, inconspicuous. The tail is conical and pointed in both sexes. It is also related to Falcaustra pelusios, a nematode that infects the gastrointestinal tract of turtles.
