= Megalobatrachonema =

Scientific classification
- Domain: Eukaryota
- Kingdom: Animalia
- Phylum: Nematoda
- Class: Chromadorea
- Order: Rhabditida
- Family: Kathlaniidae
- Genus: Megalobatrachonema; Yamaguti, 1941

Genus of roundworms

Megalobatrachonema is a nematode genus. Species of this genus are parasites of a number of amphibians including the rough-skinned newt.
