= Gongylonema ingluvicola =

Scientific classification
- Kingdom: Animalia
- Phylum: Nematoda
- Class: Chromadorea
- Order: Rhabditida
- Family: Gongylonematidae
- Genus: Gongylonema
- Species: G. ingluvicola

Binomial name
- Gongylonema ingluvicola Ransom, 1904

Species of bird

Gongylonema ingluvicola is a species in the genus Gongylonema. It is one of the spirurid nematodes that infect a vast array of animals throughout the world. Infections have been noted in both humans and in animals ranging from cows to birds. As of recent, there have been 50+ human cases reported in countries such as New Zealand, Australia, Middle East, China, and United States.

G. ingluvicola, like other tissue-dwelling species, require an insect intermediate host to ingest eggs. Infections result from the ingestion of intermediate hosts containing L_{3} stage nematodes. Upon ingestion of the insect by an appropriate host, the larvae are released and can migrate to the esophagus or buccal cavity. Humans are an accidental host who occasionally get infected by ingesting infected poultry or insects. Infected humans have described a moving sensation in the buccal cavity which includes, but is not limited to, lips, gums, tongue, and palate. Symptoms include local irritation, pharyngitis and stomatitis and bloody oozing patches in the mouth.

G. ingluvicola is commonly recognized in the esophageal epithelium of birds such as chickens, turkeys and pigeons. This worm stage burrows through the epithelium, leaving trails of eggs which find their way to the lumen, get swallowed, and eventually pass in feces. A related species, G. pulchrum, infects a variety of mammals but rarely humans.

== Morphology ==
G. ingluvicola, meaning "crop mongylonemid" can grow up to 55 millimetres (2.2 in). The larvated eggs are roughly 58 × 35 μm.

== Life cycle ==
The adult form of G. ingluvicola resides in esophageal epithelium. From there it lays unembryonated eggs which pass to the feces, known as embryonation. The L_{1}, now in the eggs which reside in feces, is ingested by an insect and molts twice taking it to an L_{3} stage. The L_{3} in the hemocoel is ingested by the animal and molts twice more. Then the adult form emerges in the esophageal or crop epithelium.

== Pathogenicity ==
Heavy infections are thought to lead to gastrointestinal disturbances that might cause emaciation. Nematodes are generally in the lumena of the gastric glands. Catarrhal gastritis may result which will eventually lead to chronic hypertrophic gastritis. The typical mucosal surface is characterized by irregular circumscribed wart-like thickenings with a finely verrucose surface.

== Treatment ==
Albendazole is a common drug treatment.
