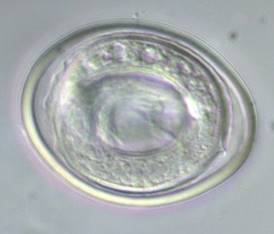
- Egg of Subulura sp.

Scientific classification
- Kingdom: Animalia
- Phylum: Nematoda
- Class: Chromadorea
- Order: Ascaridida
- Suborder: Ascaridina
- Family: Subuluridae; Travassos, 1914

Genera
- About one dozen, see text

= Subuluridae =

Family of roundworms

Subuluridae is a family of spirurian nematodes which, together with the two species of Maupasinidae, make up the superfamily Subuluroidea. Like all nematodes, they have neither a circulatory nor a respiratory system.

They number about one dozen genera and somewhat over 100 species, and are parasites of amniotes, chiefly birds and mammals.

== Systematics ==
Several subfamilies are very small or even monotypic, and might not be valid. Spiruroides might actually belong in the Gongylonematidae, which are not closely related to the Subuluridae as far as Spiruria go.

Subfamily Allodapinae Inglis, 1958

- Allodapa Diesing, 1861
- Aulonocephalus Chandler, 1935

Subfamily Labiobulurinae Quentin, 1969

- Cyclobulura Quentin, 1977
- Labiobulura Skrjabin & Schikhobalova, 1948
- Tarsubulura Inglis, 1958

Subfamily Leipoanematinae Chabaud, 1957

- Leipoanema Johnston & Mawson, 1942

Subfamily Parasubulurinae Berghe & Vuylsteke, 1938

- Parasubulura Berghe & Vuylsteke, 1938

Subfamily Subulurinae Travassos, 1914

- Inglisubulura Devamma, 1977
- Oxynema Linstow, 1899
- Primasubulura Inglis, 1958
- Spiruroides Cameron & Parnell, 1933 (tentatively placed here)
- Subulura Molin, 1860
- Travassallodapa López-Neyra, 1945
