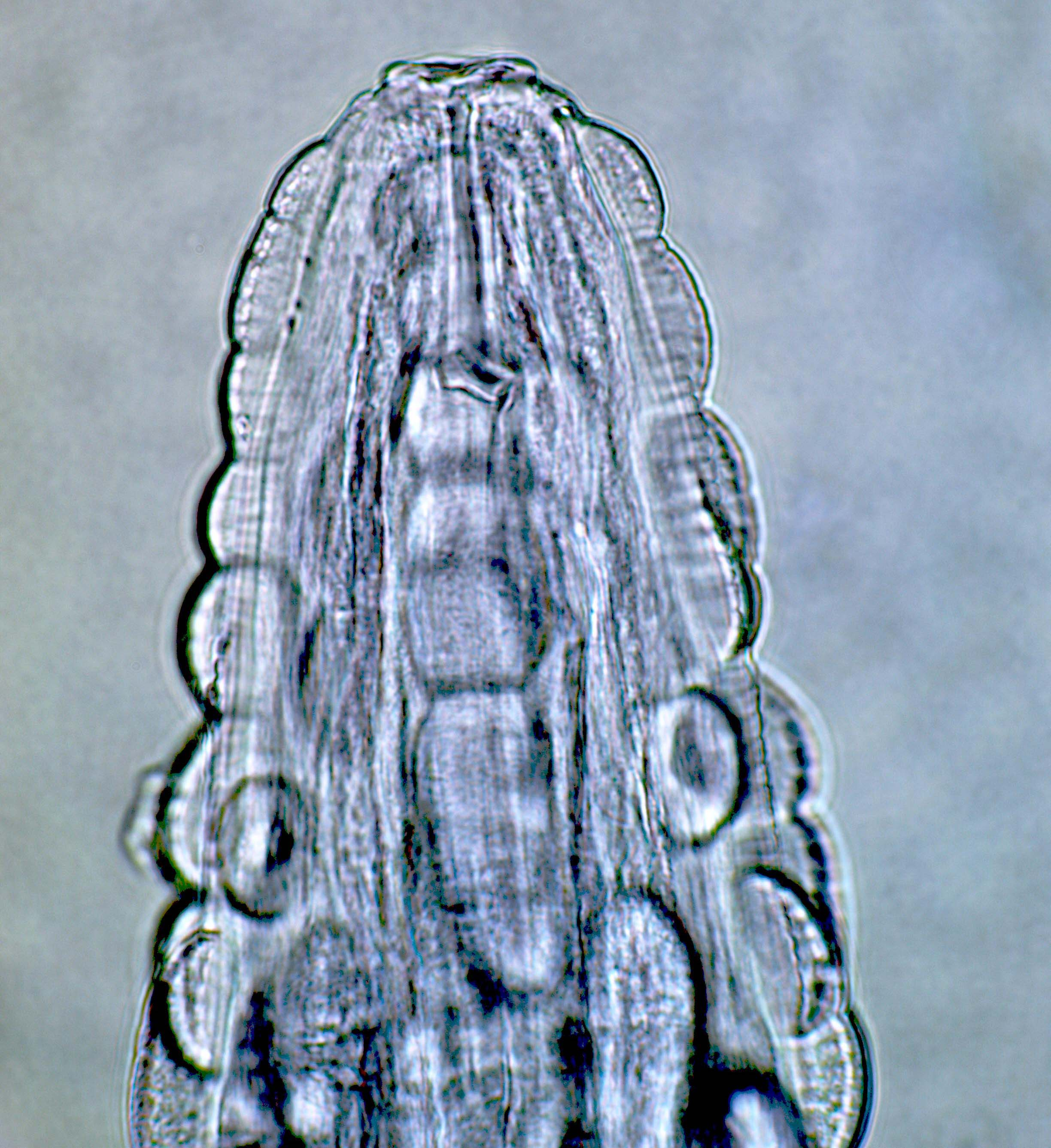
- Head of male Gongylonema pulchrum, from human infection; note characteristic bosses

Scientific classification
- Kingdom: Animalia
- Phylum: Nematoda
- Class: Chromadorea
- Order: Rhabditida
- Suborder: Spirurida
- Superfamily: Spiruroidea
- Family: Gongylonematidae; Hall, 1916
- Genus: Gongylonema; Molin, 1857

Synonyms
- Gongylomene Vaullegeard., 1901; Gongylonemoides Lent & Freitas, 1937; Misonunus Petrov, 1910; Myzomimus Stiles, 1892; Progongylonema Hernandez-Rodriguez & Gutierrez-Palomino 1993

= Gongylonema =

Genus of roundworms

Gongylonema is a genus of thread-like nematode that was described by Molin in 1857. It is the only currently valid genus in the family Gongylonematidae, though the mysterious Spiruroides – usually placed in the Subuluridae, which are not closely related to Gongylonema among the Spiruria – might actually belong here. They are parasites of birds and mammals, transmitted by insects (especially beetles). Some 38 species are known, about 12 of which have been recorded in Europe.

Several species are significant parasites of domestic animals, causing gongylonemiasis. Human infection by these nematodes is very rare: since its discovery fewer than 100 people have been reported to be infected with these parasites, always with the species G. pulchrum.

== Species ==
- Gongylonema aegypti Ashour & Lewis, 1986
- Gongylonema aequispicularis Kadenazii, 1957
- Gongylonema alecturae Johnston & Mawson, 1942
- Gongylonema baylisi Freitas & Lent, 1937
- Gongylonema beveridgei Mawson, 1971
- Gongylonema brevispiculum Seurat, 1914
- Gongylonema caucasica Kurashvili, 1941
- Gongylonema confusum Sonsino, 1896
- Gongylonema congolense Fain, 1955
- Gongylonema dipodomysi Kruidenier & Peebles, 1958
- Gongylonema dupuisi Quentin, 1965
- Gongylonema fotedari Gupta & Trivedi, 1986
- Gongylonema graberi Barre, 1980
- Gongylonema ingluvicola Ransom, 1904
- Gongylonema longispiculum Schulz, 1927
- Gongylonema macrogubernaculum Lubimov, 1931
- Gongylonema madeleinensis Diouf, Bâ, Marchand & Vassiliadès, 1997
- Gongylonema marsupialis Vaz & Pereira, 1934
- Gongylonema mesasiatica Sultanov, 1961
- Gongylonema metopidiusi Gupta & Kumar, 1977
- Gongylonema mexicanum Caballero & Zerecero, 1944
- Gongylonema minimum Molin, 1857
- Gongylonema monnigi
- Gongylonema mucronatum Seurat, 1916
- Gongylonema musculi Rudolphi, 1819
- Gongylonema neoplasticum Fibiger & Ditlevsen, 1914
- Gongylonema pacoi Hernandez & Gutierrez, 1992
- Gongylonema pithyusensis Mas-Coma, 1977
- Gongylonema problematicum Schulz, 1924
- Gongylonema pulchrum Molin, 1857
- Gongylonema rodhaini Fain, 1948
- Gongylonema saimirisi Artigas, 1933
- Gongylonema soricis Fain, 1955
- Gongylonema spalacis Schulz, 1927
- Gongylonema verrucosum Giles, 1892
