= Rondonia rondoni =

Scientific classification
- Domain: Eukaryota
- Kingdom: Animalia
- Phylum: Nematoda
- Class: Chromadorea
- Order: Rhabditida
- Family: Atractidae
- Genus: Rondonia; Travassos, 1920
- Species: R. rondoni

Binomial name
- Rondonia rondoni Travassos, 1920

Genus of roundworms

Rondonia is a monotypic genus of nematodes belonging to the family Atractidae. The only species is Rondonia rondoni.

The species is found in freshwater environments.
