= Johannes Fibiger =

Danish physician (1867–1928)

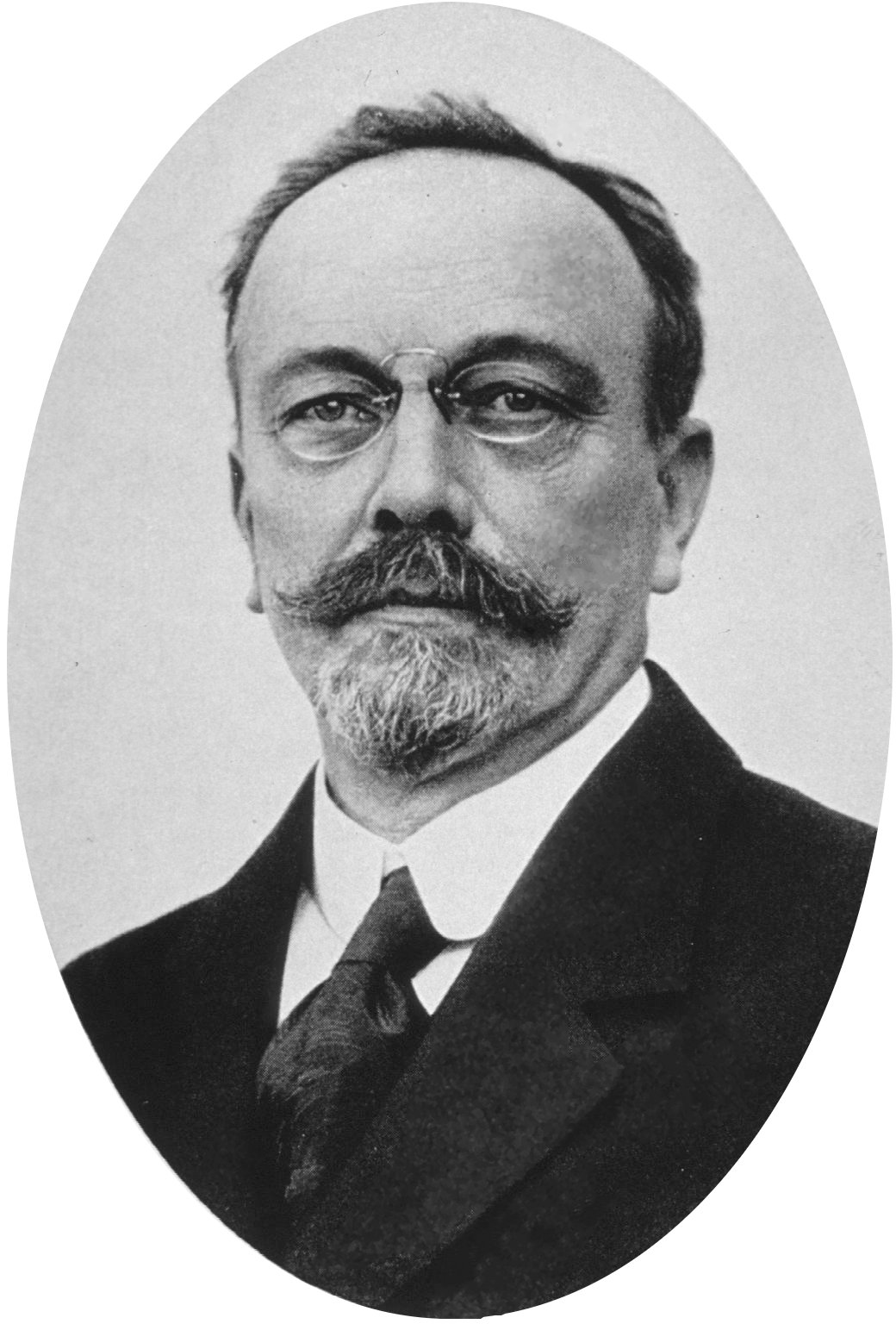
- Born: Johannes Andreas Grib Fibiger; 23 April 1867; Silkeborg, Denmark
- Died: 30 January 1928 (aged 60); Copenhagen, Denmark
- Education: University of Copenhagen
- Known for: Induction of cancer using Spiroptera carcinoma
- Spouse: Mathilde Fibiger (m. 1894)
- Children: 2
- Awards: 1926 Nobel Prize in Physiology or Medicine
- Scientific career
- Fields: Medicine; Parasitology
- Workplaces: University of Copenhagen; Royal Danish Army Medical Corps
- Author abbrev. (zoology): Fibiger

Johannes Andreas Grib Fibiger (23 April 1867 – 30 January 1928) was a Danish physician and professor of anatomical pathology at the University of Copenhagen. He was the recipient of the 1926 Nobel Prize in Physiology or Medicine "for his discovery of the Spiroptera carcinoma". He claimed to have shown that the roundworm which he called Spiroptera carcinoma (but is correctly named Gongylonema neoplasticum) could cause stomach cancer (squamous cell carcinoma) in rats and mice. His experimental results were later proven to be a case of mistaken conclusion.

While working at the Institute of Pathological Anatomy of University of Copenhagen, Fibiger discovered new roundworms in 1907 from wild rats. He suspected that the roundworms were responsible for stomach cancer in those rats. In 1913, he reported that he could experimentally induce cancer in healthy rats using the roundworms. His discovery was considered "the greatest contribution to experimental medicine" at the time. In 1926, he was nominated for the Nobel Prize in Physiology or Medicine along with Katsusaburo Yamagiwa, who had experimentally induced carcinoma by painting crude coal tar on the inner surface of rabbits' ears in 1915. However, they were considered undeserving, and the 1926 prize was not given. In the next year Fibiger alone was retrospectively chosen for the 1926 Nobel Prize.

After his death, independent researches proved that G. neoplasticum cannot cause cancer. Tumours and cancer produced by Fibiger were due to vitamin A deficiency. Historical reassessment of Fibiger's data revealed that he had mistaken non-cancerous tumours for cancerous tumours. Erling Norrby, who had served as the Permanent Secretary of the Royal Swedish Academy of Sciences and Professor and Chairman of Virology at the Karolinska Institute, in 2010 declared Fibiger's Nobel Prize as "one of the biggest blunders made by the Karolinska Institute."

Fibiger's research method on diphtheria is regarded as the origin of an important research methodology in medicine known as controlled clinical trial.

== Biography ==
Fibiger was born in Silkeborg, Midtjylland, Denmark. He was the second son of Christian Ludwig Wilhelm Fibiger and Elfride Fibiger (née Müller). His father was a local physician and his mother, an author. He was named after his uncle, who was a clergyman and a poet. His father died of internal bleeding when he was three years of age, after which the family moved to Copenhagen where his mother earned their living by writing. His mother established there the first cooking school, the Copenhagen Cooking School.

His namesake uncle supported Fibiger for his education. In 1883, at age 16, he passed his matriculation and was enrolled at the University of Copenhagen to study zoology and botany. He self-supported by teaching and working at the laboratories. He graduated in 1883. He continued for a medicine course and earned his medical degree in 1890. For a few months he worked as a physician at different hospitals, and also continued to study under Robert Koch and Emil Adolf von Behring in Berlin. Between 1891 and 1894, he was assistant to C. J. Salomonsen at the Department of Bacteriology of Copenhagen University. From 1894 he joined the Royal Danish Army Medical Corps, where he served till 1897. It was during his army service that he completed his doctoral thesis Research into the bacteriology of diphtheria. The University of Copenhagen awarded him a doctorate degree in 1895. He continued the diphtheria research at Blegdamshospitalet in Copenhagen, working as a Junior Physician. In 1897, he was appointed prosector at the Institute of Pathological Anatomy of University of Copenhagen. He was promoted to full Professor and eventually its Director in 1900. He also served as Principal of the Laboratory of Clinical Bacteriology of the Army from 1890 to 1905), and Director of the Central Laboratory of the Army and Consultant Physician to the Army Medical Service in 1905.

Fibiger died of cardiac arrest in Copenhagen on 30 January 1928.

== Contributions ==
=== Diphtheria research ===
Fibiger's doctoral research was on diphtheria. He developed more efficient method of growing bacteria in a laboratory setting. He discovered that there were two different forms (strains) of the diphtheria bacillus (Corynebacterium diphtheriae) that produce two different symptoms, now called nasopharyngeal and cutaneous diphtheria. He also produced a blood serum against the disease. He was known for his methodological system of research. One of his experiments from 1898 in which he tested the blood serum for diphtheria is regarded by some as the first controlled clinical trial. While working as a Junior Physician in Blegdamshospitalet, he tested his diphtheria serum among hundreds (484) patients. As would be in modern clinical trial, he separated serum-treated and untreated patients, and found that more of untreated patients died than the treated ones. According to an article in The British Medical Journal in 1998:

[Fibiger's experiment in 1898] was the first clinical trial in which random allocation was used and emphasised as a pivotal methodological principle. This pioneering improvement in methodology, combined with a large number of patients and rigorous planning, conduct, and reporting, makes the trial a milestone in the history of clinical trials.

=== Cancer and parasitology research ===
While studying tuberculosis in lab rats, Fibiger found tumors in some wild rats collected from Dorpat (officially Tartu, now in Estonia) in 1907. Rats having stomach tumour (papilloma) also had nematodes and their eggs. He found that some tumours were metastatic (cancerous). He hypothesised that the nematodes caused the stomach cancer. After years of investigation, he experimentally demonstrated in 1913 that the nematode could induce stomach cancer. He published his discovery in a series of three papers, and also presented them at the Académie Royale des Sciences et des Lettres de Danemark (Royal Danish Academy of Sciences and Letters), and Troisième Conférence Internationale pour l’Étude du Cancer (Third International Conference for Researches in Cancer) at Brussels the same year. He knew that the nematode was a new species, and provisionally named it Spiroptera carcinom in 1914. With Hjalmar Ditlevsen, of the Zoological Museum of the University of Copenhagen, he described it as Spiroptera (Gongylonema) neoplastica in 1914. Ditlevsen revised the description in 1918, and gave the final valid name Gongylonema neoplasticum. But Fibiger never used the formal scientific name, and persistently used Spiroptera carcinoma.

Fibiger's experiment was the first to show that helminth parasites can cause cancer, and that cancer (tumour) can be experimentally induced. His discovery was supported by the experiment of two Japanese scientists Katsusaburo Yamagiwa and Koichi Ichikawa in 1918. Yamagiwa and Ichikawa demonstrated the induction of cancer (carcinoma) in rabbits. They showed that it was relatively easy to produce cancer was by painting coal-tar on the inner surface of the ear. A number independent experiments subsequently confirmed the cancer-inducing effect of coal-tar in mice. With such supporting evidence, Fibiger's work was regarded a milestone in cancer study.

== Personal life ==
Fibiger was married to Mathilde Fibiger (1863–1954). Mathilde was his cousin who came to help her mother's business while he was studying medicine. They got married on 4 August 1894. Fibiger had been suffering from colon cancer, and a month after he received his Nobel Prize, he died of heart attack on 30 January 1928 due to his worsening cancer. He was survived by his wife and two children.

== Nobel Prize controversy ==
=== Nomination and selection ===
Fibiger was nominated for the Nobel Prize in Physiology or Medicine 18 times from 1920. In 1926, he received two nominations along with Katsusaburo Yamagiwa. Folke Henschen and Hilding Bergstrand were appointed by the Nobel Committee as assessors. They disagreed on each other's conclusion. Henschen was in favour of the nomination and concluded that "the experimental carcinoma is worthy of the Nobel Prize. It should therefore be just if the prize would be divided between Johannes Fibiger, the discoverer of the experimental spiroptera carcinoma, and Katsusaburo Yamagiwa, the discoverer of the experimental tar carcinoma." But Bergstrand opposed to it, concluding that "an experimental confirmation of a previously known fact... [referring to the prevalence of cancer among chimney sweeps and factory workers, an already established medical fact at the time] can, in this case, not be considered... that one cannot, at this point, find much support for the possibility that the work of Fibiger and Yamagiwa will have great importance in the solving of the riddle of cancer. Under such circumstances I do not consider these discoveries worthy of the Nobel Prize." The Nobel Committee could not make the final decision and decided not to give the prize for 1926. In the next year, Fibiger received seven nominations, and Yamagiwa was then excluded. Instead there were two other nominees, Otto Heinrich Warburg and Julius Wagner-Jauregg. In addition to Henschen and Bergstrand, Einar Hammersten was appointed as the third assessor. On Fibiger, Bergstrand was of the same opinion, Hammersten was in favour. Hence the three nominees were recommended for the award. The Nobel Committee decided to give the 1926 prize jointly to Fibiger and Warburg, and the 1927 prize to Wagner-Jauregg. However, the authority at the Karolinska Institute disagreed with the recommendation for Warburg for undisclosed reasons, and Fibiger became the sole winner. (Warburg was eventually awarded the prize in 1931.)

=== Posthumous criticism and disproof ===
Fibiger's discovery was unchallenged during his lifetime. The only serious criticism was by F. D. Bullock and G. L. Rohdenburg. In 1918, they argued that the cancerous tumours produced in Fibiger's experiments were similar to non-cancerous tumours. Such tumours easily developed in epithelial cells. Fibiger defended himself, saying, "That these tumors are true carcinomata cannot, thus, be doubted, and the fact that they may occur in younger animals does not diminish our right to range them among the true malignant neoplasms."

It was only after Fibiger's death that the importance of vitamin A in cancer development was fully appreciated. Fibiger had used rats which were fed vitamin A-less diet. It was found that Vitamin A deficiency alone can cause tumours and cancers. The parasites had merely caused the tissue irritation (chronic inflammation) that drove the damaged cells into cancer; any tissue irritation could have induced the tumours. The major challenge came from Richard Douglas Passey, with his colleagues A. Léese, and J.C. Knox. They reported a new finding in 1935 that S. carcinoma do not cause cancer in rats. They concluded that Fibiger had probably mistaken metaplasia (a non-cancerous tumour) with malignant neoplasia (true cancer). In 1937, W. Cramer experimentally showed that Fibiger's tumour were not cancerous. The final disproof was shown by Claude R. Hitchcock and E. T. Bell. In 1952, they repeated Fibiger's experiments using advanced microscopy and histology, and conclusively demonstrated that the tumours due to G. neoplasticum in rats were non-cancerous, and that the tumours were primarily due to vitamin A deficiency.

It is also claimed that exclusion of Yamagiwa was another mistake. Yamagiwa's work has become the primary basis for induction of tumours in cancer research. Because of this, some consider Fibiger's Nobel Prize to be undeserved particularly because Yamagiwa did not receive the prize. Encyclopædia Britannica's guide to Nobel Prizes in cancer research mentions Yamagiwa's work as a milestone without mentioning Fibiger.

Although G. neoplasticum is non-carcinogenic, other helminth parasites such as Schistosoma haematobium, Opisthorchis viverrini and Clonorchis sinensis are now established to cause cancer in humans.

== See also ==
- Carcinogenic parasite
