= Falcaustra =

Scientific classification
- Domain: Eukaryota
- Kingdom: Animalia
- Phylum: Nematoda
- Class: Chromadorea
- Order: Rhabditida
- Family: Kathlaniidae
- Genus: Falcaustra; Lane, 1915

Genus of nematodes

Falcaustra is a genus of nematodes belonging to the family Kathlaniidae.

The genus has almost cosmopolitan distribution.

Species:

- Falcaustra annandalei (Baylis & Daubney, 1922) Chabaud & Golvan, 1957
- Falcaustra ararath (Massino, 1924)
- Falcaustra armenica Massino, 1924
- Falcaustra barbi Baylis & Daubney, 1922
- Falcaustra belemensis Baker & Bain, 1981
- Falcaustra bengalensis Manna & Mahapatra, 1989
- Falcaustra brevicaudata (Khan & Yaseen, 1969) Soota, 1983
- Falcaustra chauhani (Soota, 1975) Petter, 1979
- Falcaustra chiloscyllii (Thwaite, 1927) Soota, 1983
- Falcaustra condorcanquii Ibanez & Eleazar
- Falcaustra desilvai Bursey, Goldberg & Bauer, 2009
- Falcaustra donanaensis Hidalgo-Vila, Ribas, Florencio, Perez-Santigosa & Casanova, 2006
- Falcaustra dubia Yuen, 1963
- Falcaustra duyagi (Tubangui & Villaamil, 1933) Freitas & Lent, 1941
- Falcaustra falcata (Linstow, 1906) Lane, 1915
- Falcaustra fernandoi (Sathananthan, 1972) Baker, 1987
- Falcaustra greineri Bursey & Kinsella, 2003
- Falcaustra heosemydis Bursey, Goldberg & Miller, 2004
- Falcaustra kalasiensis (Karve & Naik, 1951) Vassiliades & Troncy, 1973
- Falcaustra kaverii (Karve & Naik, 1951) Vassiliades & Troncy, 1973
- Falcaustra kempi (Baylis & Daubney, 1922) Chabaud & Golvan, 1957
- Falcaustra khadrai (Karve, 1941) Chabaud & Golvan, 1957
- Falcaustra kinsellai Bursey & Freeman, 2005
- Falcaustra kutcheri Bursey, Platt & Rainwater, 2000
- Falcaustra leptocephala Baylis & Daubney, 1922
- Falcaustra leptodactyla
- Falcaustra malaysiaia Bursey, Goldberg & Grismer, 2014
- Falcaustra manouriacola Bursey & Rivera, 2009
- Falcaustra mascula (Rudolphi, 1819) Freitas & Lent, 1941
- Falcaustra mirandafroesi (Fortes, 1981)
- Falcaustra nilgiriensis (Soota & Chaturvedi, 1971) Petter, 1979
- Falcaustra onama (Karve, 1927) Freitas & Lent, 1941
- Falcaustra pahangi Yuen, 1963
- Falcaustra pillaii (Sathananthan, 1972) Baker, 1987
- Falcaustra piscicola (von Linstow, 1907) Campana-Rouget, 1961
- Falcaustra purchoni Yuen, 1963
- Falcaustra purvisi (Baylis, 1933) Chabaud & Golvan, 1957
- Falcaustra rangoonica (Chatterji, 1936) Freitas & Lent, 1941
- Falcaustra roberti (Chou & Lowe, 1984) Bursey & Kinsella, 2003
- Falcaustra samarensis Bursey, Goldberg, Slier & Brown, 2020
- Falcaustra sanjuanensis Gonzalez, Sanabria & Quiroga, 2013
- Falcaustra siamensis Baylis, 1920
- Falcaustra similis Moravec & Van As, 2004
- Falcaustra stewarti Baylis & Daubney, 1922
- Falcaustra stromateii (Bilqees & Khanum, 1971) Soota, 1983
- Falcaustra tannaensis Bursey, Goldberg, Hamilton & Austin, 2010
- Falcaustra tchadi Vassiliades & Troncy, 1973
- Falcaustra testudinis Baylis & Daubney, 1922
- Falcaustra tintlwini Bursey & Platt, 2018
- Falcaustra trilokiae (Singh, 1958) Chabaud, 1978
