= Cosmocercoides =

Scientific classification
- Domain: Eukaryota
- Kingdom: Animalia
- Phylum: Nematoda
- Class: Chromadorea
- Order: Rhabditida
- Family: Cosmocercidae
- Genus: Cosmocercoides; Wilkie, 1930

Type species
- Cosmocercoides pulcher Wilkie, 1930

Genus of roundworms

Cosmocercoides is a genus of nematode within the order Ascaridida. Nematodes within the genus Cosmocercoides have been found as parasites within the rough-skinned newt, Taricha granulosa. Cosmocercoides includes the following species:

- Cosmocercoides barodensis Rao, 1979
- Cosmocercoides bufonis Karve, 1944
- Cosmocercoides dukae (Holl, 1928)
- Cosmocercoides fotedari Arya, 1992
- Cosmocercoides kumaoni Arya, 1992
- Cosmocercoides lanceolatus Rao, 1979
- Cosmocercoides multipapillata Khera, 1958
- Cosmocercoides nainitalensis Arya, 1979
- Cosmocercoides pulcher Wilkie, 1930
- Cosmocercoides rickae Ogden, 1966
- Cosmocercoides rusticum (Kreis, 1932)
- Cosmocercoides skrjabini (Ivanitskii, 1940)
- Cosmocercoides speleomantis Ricci, 1988
- Cosmocercoides tibetanum Baylis, 1927
- Cosmocercoides tridens Wilkie, 1930
- Cosmocercoides variabilis (Harwood, 1930)
