= Cosmocercoidea =

Scientific classification
- Kingdom: Animalia
- Phylum: Nematoda
- Class: Chromadorea
- Order: Rhabditida
- Suborder: Spirurina
- Infraorder: Ascaridomorpha
- Superfamily: Cosmocercoidea; Railliet, 1916

Families
- Atractidae Railliet, 1917; Cosmocercidae Railliet, 1916; Kathlaniidae Lane, 1914

Superfamily of roundworms

Cosmocercoidea is a nematode superfamily in the order Rhabditida.
