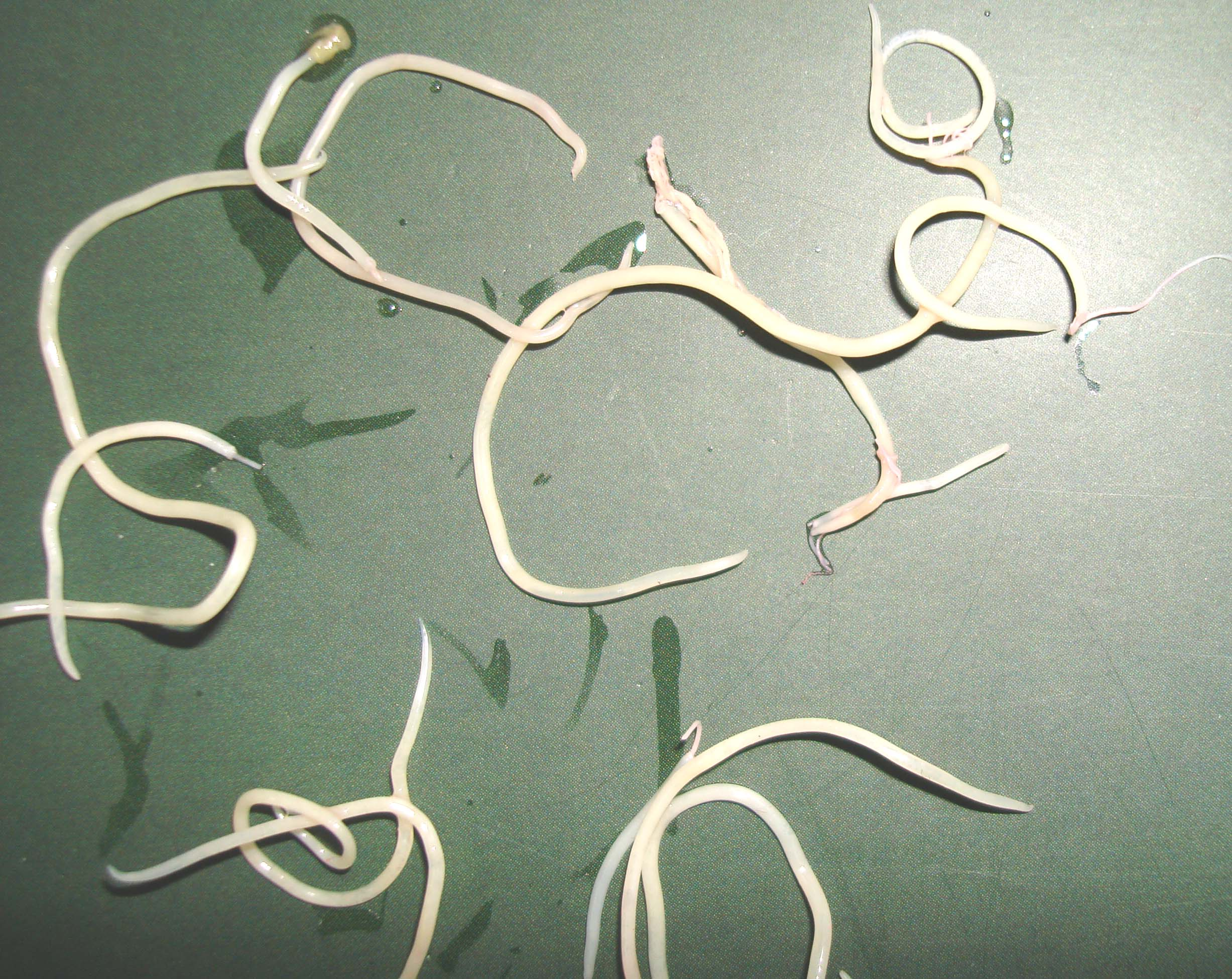
- Ascaridia

Scientific classification
- Domain: Eukaryota
- Kingdom: Animalia
- Phylum: Nematoda
- Class: Chromadorea
- Order: Ascaridida
- Family: Ascaridiidae
- Genus: Ascaridia; Dujardin, 1845

Diversity
- 15 species

= Ascaridia =

Genus of roundworms

Ascaridia /æskəˈrɪdiə/ is a genus of parasitic nematodes. Members of the genus are primarily intestinal parasites of birds. Three species are well known, namely, A. galli found mostly in chickens, A. dissimilis in turkeys, and A. columbae in pigeons. Lesser known species such as A. hermaphrodita, A. sergiomeirai, A. ornata, A. nicobarensis, and A. platyceri are found in parrots.

Among these, A. galli is the most important and most pathogenic species, responsible for ascaridiasis of poultry. The eggs of these nematodes are characterized by a thick shell, smooth and ellipsoidal, and composed of three distinct layers.

The eggs of A. dissimilis are marginally bigger than A. galli, and A. columbae is marginally smaller. All these ascarid eggs are similar in appearance to Heterakis gallinarum.

All three species exhibit a direct lifecycle involving the release of eggs into the soil and the subsequent reingestion of them in food. A. columbae may also migrate through the liver.

== Clinical signs and diagnosis ==
Symptoms of heavy infection include anorexia, diarrhea, stunted growth, listlessness, a change in behavior, and enteritis. Heavy infections can cause a partial or total obstruction of the gastrointestinal tract. Laying hens may produce soft eggs with thin and misshapened shells.

Clinical signs are more common in young chickens less than three months old, as older chicken develop some resistance to infection. Infection may be diagnosed on clinical signs and fecal examination. Alternatively, post mortem examination should demonstrate enteritis - caused by the emergence of larvae from the mucosa. The gastrointestinal tract may also be distended in chronic cases.

== Treatment and control ==
Piperazine salts, levamisole, and benzimidazoles are all reported treatments.

Ascarid eggs are resistant to desiccation, persist for a long time in the environment, and remain directly infective. Therefore, control of infection involves the prevention of contamination of feeders and drinkers with feces (by raising them off the ground), pasture rotation, and regular dosing with the above-mentioned treatments, especially in young birds.
