= Myleusnema bicornis =

Scientific classification
- Kingdom: Animalia
- Phylum: Nematoda
- Class: Chromadorea
- Order: Rhabditida
- Family: Kathlaniidae
- Genus: Myleusnema
- Species: M. bicornis

Binomial name
- Myleusnema bicornis Moravec & Thatcher 1996

Species of roundworm

Myleusnema bicornis is an intestinal parasite of Myleus ternetzi, or "Ternetz's Silver Dollar", a freshwater Characoid fish commonly found in the French Guiana river. M. bicornis has several unusual morphological characteristics, namely the two postcloacal "horns" in the posterior of males, and a separate elongated cephalic region (head) that may be extended and retracted. These features differ vastly from other Cosmocercoidean nematodes, as well as any others within the family Kathlaniidae, and as such necessitate the creation of the new genus Myleusnema; however, no genetic taxonomic studies have been performed.

== Etymology ==
The generic name derives from the Greek terms Myleus (generic name of fish host) and nema (short for nematode), whereas the specific name, bicornis, refers to the two postcloacal "horns" present on males.

== Morphology ==
Myleusnema bicornis possess characteristics which are common for all nematodes: they are long and cylindrical with a "worm-like" shape, show bilateral symmetry, and contain a pseudocoelom, a primitive body cavity. Only longitudinal muscles are present within nematodes, which are covered by a protective cuticle layer. Nerve chords relay stimuli from sensory organs such as amphids, phasmids, cephalic papillae, and caudal papillae. M. bicornis differs from other nematodes in that it possess an extended oesophageal cavity, a ventral pre-anal sucker, and an unusual number of caudal papillae (12 total, 1 lone). The cephalic extremity is also made up of three lips and lamella-like formations. The combination of these features taxonomically place the organism into the family Kathlaniidae.

M. bicornis has the ability to extend or retract its cephalic region, though the specific function of this ability is unknown. Its caudal papillae are unique in both number and distribution: 10 subventral pairs and 2 lateral pairs, along with one unpaired papillae in front of the cloaca. Sexual dimorphism is also present in Myleusnema bicornis, in the form of two postloacal "horns" present on males.
