= Cyrtosomum =

Scientific classification
- Kingdom: Animalia
- Phylum: Nematoda
- Class: Chromadorea
- Order: Rhabditida
- Family: Atractidae
- Genus: Cyrtosomum; Gedoelst, 1919

Genus of roundworms

Cyrtosomum is a genus of nematodes belonging to the family Atractidae.

The species of this genus are found in America.

Species:

- Cyrtosomum heynemani Gambino, 1958
- Cyrtosomum kachugae (Steward, 1914)
- Cyrtosomum lissemysi Gupta & Aggerwal, 1974
- Cyrtosomum longicaudatum Brenes & Bravo, 1960
- Cyrtosomum penneri Gambino, 1957
- Cyrtosomum readi Gambino, 1958
- Cyrtosomum scelopori Gedoelst, 1919
