= Probstmayria =

Scientific classification
- Kingdom: Animalia
- Phylum: Nematoda
- Class: Chromadorea
- Order: Rhabditida
- Family: Atractidae
- Genus: Probstmayria; Ransom, 1907

Genus of roundworms

The Probstmayria is a nematode genus belonging to the family Atractidae

Species:

- Probstmayria vivipara Probstmayr, 1865
