= Carcinogenic parasite =

Parasitic organism that causes cancer

Carcinogenic parasites are parasitic organisms that depend on other organisms (called hosts) for their survival, and cause cancer in such hosts. Three species of flukes (trematodes) are medically-proven carcinogenic parasites, namely the urinary blood fluke (Schistosoma haematobium), the Southeast Asian liver fluke (Opisthorchis viverrini) and the Chinese liver fluke (Clonorchis sinensis). S. haematobium is prevalent in Africa and the Middle East, and is the leading cause of bladder cancer (only next to tobacco smoking). O. viverrini and C. sinensis are both found in eastern and southeastern Asia, and are responsible for cholangiocarcinoma (cancer of the bile ducts). The International Agency for Research on Cancer declared them in 2009 as a Group 1 biological carcinogens in humans.

Other parasites are also linked to various cancers. Among protozoan parasites, Toxoplasma gondii, Cryptosporidium parvum, Trichomonas vaginalis and Theileria are associated with specific cancer cells. Plasmodium falciparum can also be an indirect cause of cancer. Tapeworms such as Echinococcus granulosus and Taenia solium may directly or indirectly cause cancer. Liver flukes such as Opisthorchis viverrini and Platynosomum fastosum can cause cancer in domesticated animals. Roundworms such as Strongyloides stercoralis, Heterakis gallinarum, and Trichuris muris are known to cause cancer in animals.

== History ==
A rat roundworm Gongylonema neoplasticum was the first parasite discovered—allegedly—to cause cancer. A Danish physician Johannes Fibiger discovered it in 1907, and experimentally showed that he could induce stomach cancer in rats using the roundworm infection in 1913. In 1914, he gave the name Spiroptera (Gongylonema) neoplastica, but later changed it to Spiroptera carcinoma. Fibiger won the 1926 Nobel Prize in Physiology or Medicine "for his discovery of the Spiroptera carcinoma". However, his interpretation was later found to be false, and that the roundworm was not carcinogenic on its own. Fibiger's Nobel Prize was described as "one of the biggest blunders made by the Karolinska Institute."

The first true carcinogenic parasite discovered was Schistosoma haematobium. Theodor Maximillian Bilharz, a German physician at the Kasr el-Aini Hospital in Cairo recovered the adult fluke from a dead soldier in 1851. He named it Distomum haematobium. The disease is often called bilharzia in honour of the discoverer. The infectivity and life cycle was discovered by Scottish physician Robert Thomson Leiper in 1915. A British Surgeon Reginald Harrison, at the Liverpool Royal Infirmary, was the first to note its role in cancer. In 1889, he found that four people out of five cancer victims had bilharzia. A German physician Carl Goebel confirmed in 1903 that bladder tumour occurred in most bilharzia patients. By 1905, he was convinced that carcinoma of bladder was due to bilharzia.

== Group 1 carcinogens in human ==
Three flukes, urinary blood fluke (Schistosoma haematobium), Southeast Asian liver fluke (Opisthorchis viverrini) and Chinese liver fluke (Clonorchis sinensis) are classified as Group 1 carcinogens, i.e. they are substantiated and directly cancer-causing agents.

=== Schistosoma haematobium ===
S. haematobium is a digenetic trematode found in Africa and the Middle East. It is the major agent of schistosomiasis, the most prevalent parasitic infection in humans. It is the only blood fluke that infects the urinary tract, causing urinary schistosomiasis, and is the leading cause of bladder cancer (only next to tobacco smoking). Its life cycle is transmission between humans and freshwater snail, species of Bulinus. The larvae live in water bodies from where they infect the hosts by penetrating the skin. Adults are found in the venous plexuses around the urinary bladder and the released eggs travels to the wall of the urine bladder causing haematuria and fibrosis of the bladder. The bladder becomes calcified, and there is increased pressure on ureters and kidneys (hydronephrosis). Inflammation of the genitals due to S. haematobium may contribute to the propagation of HIV. Antigens produced by the eggs induce granuloma formation. Granulomata in turn coalesce to form tubercles, nodules or masses that often ulcerate. This creates the pathological lesions found in the bladder wall, ureter and renal; and also tumour, both benign and malignant.

=== Opisthorchis viverrini ===
O. viverrini is a food-borne liver fluke that mainly attacks the area of the bile duct. Infection with the parasite, called opisthorchiasis is the major cause of cholangiocarcinoma, a cancer of the bile ducts, in northern Thailand, the Lao People's Democratic Republic, Vietnam and Cambodia. O. viverrini has three successive host for its life cycle – the first intermediate hosts are freshwater snails of the genus Bithynia, the second intermediate hosts are different cyprinid fish, and humans are the definitive hosts. Generally opisthorchiasis due to O. viverrini is harmless without any clinical symptoms, but in rare cases, cholangitis, cholecystitis, and cholangiocarcinoma can develop. O. viverrini invades the bile ducts and, rarely, the gall bladder and pancreatic duct. Heavy infection can produce problems such as fibrosis in the liver, gall bladder and bile ducts. Pathological effects on the bile ducts including inflammation, epithelial desquamation, goblet cell metaplasia, epithelial and adenomatous hyperplasia and periductal fibrosis collectively promote cholangiocarcinoma. Though it is not immediately life-threatening, cancer develops after 30–40 years, and the ensuing death is rapid—within 3–6 months of diagnosis.

=== Clonorchis sinensis ===
C. sinensis is also a food-borne liver fluke. It is the most prevalent human trematode in Asia, and is found in Korea, China, Vietnam and also Russia. 85% of the cases are found in China. It is transmitted similarly to O. viverrini, but the species of snails are varied, of which Parafossarulus manchouricus is the most common. The cyprinid fish hosts are also different. General clonorchiasis is indicated with fatigue, abdominal discomfort, anorexia, weight loss, diarrhea, liver cirrhosis and jaundice. The most severe infections cause cholangiocarcinoma and hepatic carcinoma.

== Indirect or putative carcinogens ==
Infection with malarial parasite Plasmodium falciparum is classified by IARC as probable (Group 2A) carcinogen. Schistosoma japonicum is a possible (Group 2B) carcinogen. There is a close association between the cat liver fluke Opisthorchis felineus and bile duct cancer among people in Russia.

Toxoplasma gondii and eye cancer (intraocular lymphoma) was detected by PCR from two human cases. Strongyloides stercoralis eggs and adult worms may be linked with gastric adenocarcinoma and colon adenocarcinoma in Korea. Cryptosporidium parvum infection is associated with colorectal carcinoma.

== Carcinogens in animals ==
The roundworm Trichuris muris infection can increase the number of tumours in mice. Heavy infection with the trematode Platynosomum fastosum is associated with cholangiocarcinoma in cats. Cryptosporidium parvum infection can be the cause of carcinoma in the gut of mice.
