= Gubernaculum (nematode anatomy) =

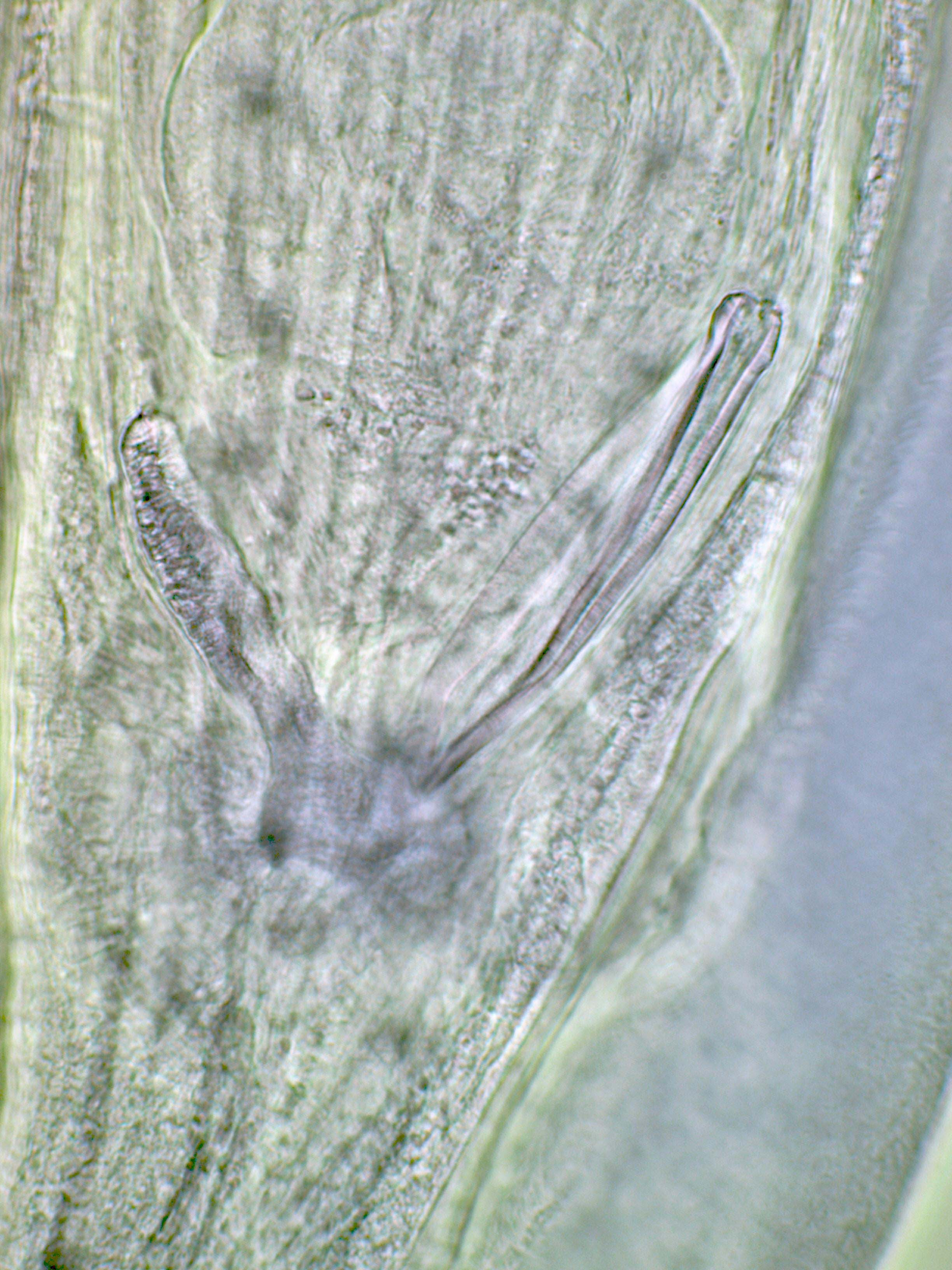
Posterior end of a male nematode, Gongylonema pulchrum, showing right spicule and gubernaculum

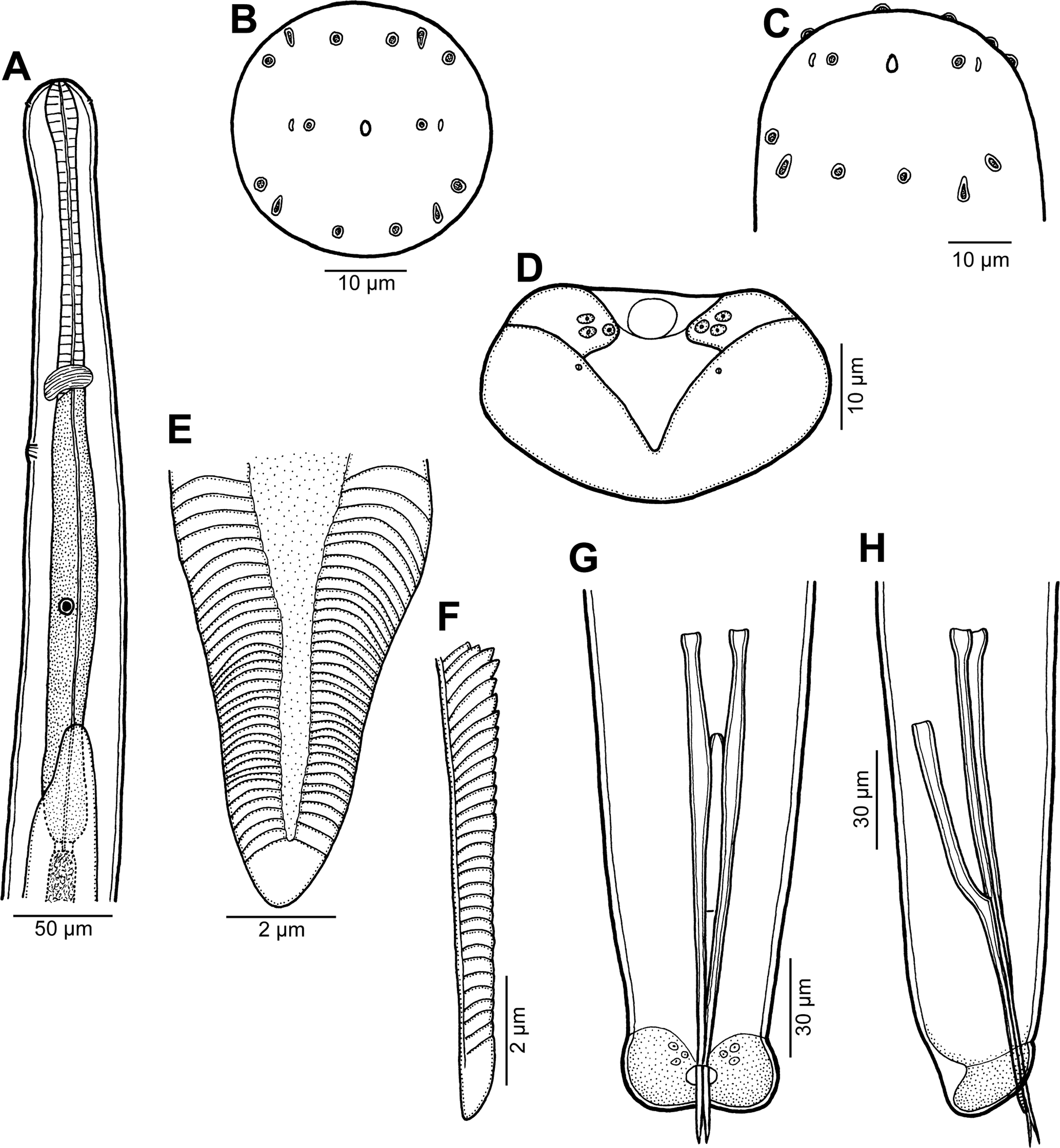
Drawings of a male philometrid nematode - E and F represent the gubernaculum

In nematodes, the gubernaculum is a hardened or sclerotized structure in the wall that guides the protrusion of the spicule during copulation. For example, in Caenorhabditis elegans, spicules serve to open and dilate the vagina of the hermaphrodite and the gubernaculum is a grooved plate in which the spicules move; the gubernaculum is controlled by two erector and two protractor muscles.

The shape and size of the gubernaculum are often important characters for the systematics of nematodes.
