= Gongylonema neoplasticum =

Scientific classification
- Kingdom: Animalia
- Phylum: Nematoda
- Class: Chromadorea
- Order: Rhabditida
- Family: Gongylonematidae
- Genus: Gongylonema
- Species: G. neoplasticum

Binomial name
- Gongylonema neoplasticum (Fibiger & Ditlevsen, 1914) Ditlevsen, 1918

Species of roundworm

Gongylonema neoplasticum (more famously as Spiroptera carcinoma) is a roundworm parasite of rats. It was discovered by a Danish physician Johannes Fibiger in 1907. Fibiger and Hjalmar Ditlevsen made a formal description in 1914 as Spiroptera (Gongylonema) neoplastica. But Ditlevsen gave the final valid name Gongylonema neoplasticum in 1918. The nematode is transmitted between rats and cockroaches.

When Fibiger discovered the nematode in the stomach of rats, he found that the stomach had tumours. Inspired by the possible link of the nematode and tumour, he performed experiments to induce tumours with nematode infection. He published his experimental success in 1913. The nematode experiment earned Fibiger the 1926 Nobel Prize in Physiology or Medicine, but under controversial circumstances. Moreover, it was later proven that Fibiger came to a wrong conclusion, that the nematode is not carcinogenic. Erling Norrby, who had served as the Permanent Secretary of the Royal Swedish Academy of Sciences and Professor and Chairman of Virology at the Karolinska Institute, declared Fibiger's Nobel Prize as "one of the biggest blunders made by the Karolinska Institute."

== Discovery ==
A Danish physician, Johannes Fibiger, while working as Director of the Institute of Pathological Anatomy at the University of Copenhagen, dissected some wild rats collected from Dorpat (now, Tartu, in Estonia) in 1907. He discovered nematodes and their eggs in the stomach of rats, and more importantly, the rats had stomach tumour (papilloma). He found that some tumours were metastatic (cancerous), from which he built a hypothesis that the nematodes caused stomach cancer. After five years he experimentally demonstrated that the nematode could induce stomach cancer. He published his discovery in a series of three papers in 1913, and also presented them at the Académie Royale des Sciences et des Lettres de Danemark (Royal Danish Academy of Sciences and Letters), and Troisième Conférence Internationale pour l’Étude du Cancer (Third International Conference for Researches in Cancer) at Brussels the same year. He knew that the nematode was a new species, and provisionally named it Spiroptera carcinom in 1914. With the help of Hjalmar Ditlevsen, of the Zoological Museum of the University of Copenhagen, he made a complete zoological description and named it Spiroptera (Gongylonema) neoplastica in 1914. Ditlevsen revised the description in 1918, and gave the final valid name Gongylonema neoplasticum.

== Biology ==
=== Structure ===
G. neoplasticum is a gastrointestinal parasite of rats, Rattus norvegicus and R. rattus. The adult roundworms are present in the epithelium of the anterior portion of the digestive tract, including the mouth, tongue, oesophagus and fundus. The body is cylindrical and elongated with both ends narrowing down. The body covering called cuticle is regularly striated. Although they are structurally similar, male and female can be easily differentiated. An adult male is relatively smaller, measuring 1.5 cm long and 0.1-0.16 mm wide. Its posterior end is more pointed and bent inward. The tail end contains cloaca and precloacal sucker on the ventral side, which are surrounded by sensory structures called caudal papillae. Two thread-like projections spicules originate from the cloaca. The female is considerable larger, about 4–5 cm long and 0.23 mm to 0.33 mm in diameter. The tail is bluntly rounded. There is a single anus, but sucker and papillae are absent.

=== Life cycle ===
G. neoplasticum completes its life cycle in two hosts, rats as definitive hosts, and cockroaches (Periplaneta) as intermediate hosts. It is hermaphrodite, and has both male and female reproductive organs in the same body. The male reproductive system consists of a single testis, vas deferens, seminal vesicles, ejaculatory duct, two spicules, gubernaculum and bursa. Female reproductive organs include a pair of ovaries, oviducts, seminal receptacle, uteri and a long oviduct, vagina and vulva. The eggs are oval shaped, and enclosed in double egg membrane. They are about 57x33 μm in diameter. Inside the membrane is an embryo. Eggs are laid in the intestine of the host and excreted along with the faeces. The infested faeces are eaten by cockroaches. Inside the cockroach, the embryonic membrane is removed liberating the embryo. The embryo move to the muscle layer where it grow into a thread-like larva after 4–5 weeks. Then after 3 weeks they undergo structural modification called moulting. After this, they become infective to rats, whenever they eat an infected cockroach.

== Nobel Prize ==
Fibiger's experiment was the first to show that nematodes cause cancer, and that cancer (tumour) can be experimentally induced. His discovery was supported by the experiment of two Japanese scientists Katsusaburo Yamagiwa and Koichi Ichikawa in 1918. Yamagiwa and Ichikawa showed that it was possible to induce cancer (carcinoma) in rabbits, and that the simplest method was by painting coal-tar on the inner surface of the ear. They even showed that different mechanical or chemical irritation, especially the painting of coal-tar upon the inner surface of the ear was the most effective in inducing carcinoma in rabbits. A number of independent experiments subsequently confirmed the cancer-inducing effect of coal-tar in mice. The importance of Fibiger's work was regarded as conclusive. He was awarded the Nobel Prize in Physiology or Medicine in 1926.

=== Controversy ===
From 1920 onward, Fibiger was nominated for the Nobel Prize for Physiology or Medicine 18 times. In 1920, he received two nominations, and the nominations included Katsusaburo Yamagiwa. But the two assessors appointed by the Nobel Committee, Folke Henschen and Hilding Bergstrand could not come to a mutual agreement. Henschen was in favour of the prize for the two nominees, while Bergstrand was adamant that they did not deserve. Bergstand conclusion was that there was not "much support for the possibility that the work of Fibiger and Yamagiwa will have great importance in the solving of the riddle of cancer. Under such circumstances I do not consider these discoveries worthy of the Nobel Prize." The Nobel Committee decided not to give the 1926 award. But Fibiger, without Yamagiwa, was again considered for the award in 1927. There were two other nominees: Otto Heinrich Warburg, for his works of cancer metabolism and respiratory enzymes, and Julius Wagner-Jauregg, for the discovery of malariotherapy. The Nobel Committee resolved that Fibiger and Warburg would jointly receive the Nobel Prize for 1926, and Wagner-Jauregg for 1927. But the Karolinska Institute overruled the decision and rejected Warburg. (Warburg was eventually awarded in 1931.) Fibiger became the sole winner of the 1926 Nobel Prize in Physiology or Medicine, "for his discovery of the Spiroptera carcinoma".

== Disproof of Fibiger's discovery ==
Experimental evidence later refuted Fibiger's Nobel Prize discovery. In 1918, there was a critical comment from F. D. Bullock and G. L. Rohdenburg that Fibiger could have confused cancer-like (neoplastic) tumour from true (metastatic) cancer, and that he had not induced actual cancer. But Fibiger responded "That these tumors are true carcinomata cannot, thus, be doubted, and the fact that they may occur in younger animals does not diminish our right to range them among the true malignant neoplasms." After his death in 1928, there was a better understanding of the nature of cancer—on the differences of neoplastic tumour and malignant tumours (cancer), challenging the claims of Fibiger. The most important criticism was by Richard Douglas Passey, with his colleagues A. Léese, and J.C. Knox. Their experimental conclusions were that the nematode could not cause cancer, and that experimentally-induced cancer was due to other factors such as vitamin A deficiency. Fibiger used a vitamin A-less diet for his experimental rats, and it was by then established that vitamin A deprivation alone could induce cancer. An elaborate experiment by W. Cramer in 1937 came to the conclusion that Fibiger's tumour could not be a true cancer. A more rigorous study was done by Claude R. Hitchcock and E. T. Bell in 1952. They repeated Fibiger's experiments using advanced techniques, and concluded that the tumours induced by the nematode in rats were metaplasia, not cancer. All tumours were due to vitamin A deficiency. Systematic reanalysis of Fibiger's data also gave the same conclusion that G. neoplasticum can cause tumour, but is not carcinogenic by itself.
