= Aplectana herediaensis =

Scientific classification
- Domain: Eukaryota
- Kingdom: Animalia
- Phylum: Nematoda
- Class: Chromadorea
- Order: Rhabditida
- Family: Cosmocercidae
- Genus: Aplectana
- Species: A. herediaensis

Binomial name
- Aplectana herediaensis Bursey, Goldberg & Telford, 2006

Species of roundworm

Aplectana herediaensis is a species of nematodes. It was found in the large intestines of Lepidophyma flavimaculatum, and is the third species of this genus to be described in a lizard host.

== Description ==
They are small, slender nematodes. Females are of a slightly greater length than males. They have a cuticle bearing striations, longitudinal striations from the pharyngeal region to the tip of the tail and transverse striation in the same region. They have narrow lateral alae beginning in the region of the nerve ring and ending on the tail in both sexes. They have a triangular mouth with three lips. Their oesophagus is divided into a short anterior pharyngeal portion, an elongated corpus, a short and narrow isthmus, and a large valved bulb.
