= Elfride Fibiger =

Danish writer and philanthropist

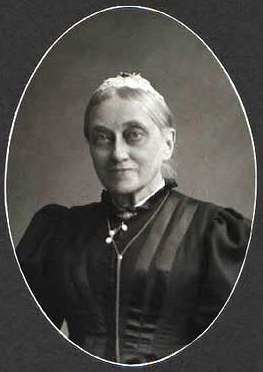
Elfride Fibiger (1908)

Christine Dorothea Michelle Elfride Fibiger née Müller (1832–1911) was a Danish writer and philanthropist. She first published a successful cookbook in 1871; then, after her hustand's death in 1873, she supplemented her income by writing a series of novels and short stories, all in support of women's emancipation. These included Askepot (1880) and Præst og Læge (1890). In 1882, she was behind the establishment of a cooking school in Copenhagen, later known as Kjøbenhavns uddannelsesskole for tjenestepiger og vordende husmødre (Copenhagen's Training School for Maids and Future Housewives), which she ran until 1889. Her later writings supported vocational opportunities for women, receiving recommendations from government ministries and professional associations. Her memoirs were published posthumously.

== Early life ==
Born on 17 July 1832 in Copenhagen, Christine Dorothea Michelle Elfride Müller was the daughter of the high-ranking customs official Johan Michael Andreas Müller (1805–1881) and his wife Charlotte Sophie Thora née Meyer (1805–1868). In 1856, she married the physician Christian Emanuel August Fibiger (1819–1873) with whom she had two children, Louise (1859) and the subsequent Nobel Prize Winner Johannes (1867–1928).

Brought up in a well-to-do family with cultural and political interests, she spent her childhood in Flensburg, Copenhagen and Aarhus, depending on where her father was stationed. In addition to tuition by her father, she attended Jomfru Foersoms Institut, a girls' school in Copenhagen. After she married, she moved to Silkeborg and in 1868 to Kolding where her husband was employed.

== Career ==
As a result of working as her husband's assistant, she acquired knowledge of health and nutrition which enabled her in 1871 to publish Veiledning i Tilberedelse af Mad for Syge og Svage (Guide to the Preparation of Food for the Sick and Weak). After her husband's death in 1928, she moved to Copenhagen where she supplemented her income by writing. She began with accounts of life in Jutland which included En gammel Mands Erindringer (An Old Man's Memoirs, 1875), Hedens Hemmeligheder (Pagan Secrets, 1877), and Sorte Stefan (Black Stefan, 1879). Her most significant novels and short stories were however those about women in romantic situations which emphasized their emancipation and their place in their home. These included En Magdalenehistorie (A Magdalene Story, 1877) about a fallen girl rescued by a bourgeois housewife, Askepot (Cinderella, 1880, To Fortællinger (Two Stories, 1886) and Præst og Læge (Priest and Doctor, 1890). Her works were well received but some were felt to be rather sketchy. Some were translated in German, English and Russian.

Fibiger was a keen contributor to magazines, writing about the women's cause and the important role women should play in the home. In 1882, she established Tidsskrift for Kvinder i de tre nordiske Riger (Journal for Women in the Three Nordic Realms) which closed in 1884. She also supported the efforts of the Danish Women's Society, explaining how women could become active in philanthropy and pedagogy. In particular, she emphasized the role of women in the kitchen, explaining the importance of hygiene and nutrition. Publications included Vore Tjenestefolk (Our Servants, 1881), Den ubemidlede Klasses Døtre (Daughters of the Wealthy, 1888), and Nutidens Ansvar og Forpligtelser overfor Døttrene af Arbeiderklassen og anden ubemidlet Stand (Our Current Responsibilities and Obligations towards Working-Class Women, 1889). She supported educational institutions designed to counter prostitution by taking a moral stand.

Elfride Fibiger died in Copenhagen on 2 January 1911 and was buried in Kolding. Her memoirs describing her married life, Fra Provinsen (From the Provinces), were published posthumously in 1939.
