= Aplectana =

Scientific classification
- Kingdom: Animalia
- Phylum: Nematoda
- Class: Chromadorea
- Order: Rhabditida
- Family: Cosmocercidae
- Genus: Aplectana

Genus of roundworms

Aplectana is a genus of nematodes. It includes, among other species, Aplectana herediaensis.
