= Chitwoodchabaudiidae =

Scientific classification
- Domain: Eukaryota
- Kingdom: Animalia
- Phylum: Nematoda
- Class: Chromadorea
- Order: Rhabditida
- Family: Chitwoodchabaudiidae

Family of roundworms

Chitwoodchabaudiidae is a family of nematodes belonging to the order Rhabditida.

Genera:

- Chitwoodchabaudia Puylaert, 1970
