= Schneidernematidae =

Scientific classification
- Domain: Eukaryota
- Kingdom: Animalia
- Phylum: Nematoda
- Class: Chromadorea
- Order: Rhabditida
- Family: Schneidernematidae

Family of nematodes

Schneidernematidae is a family of nematodes belonging to the order Rhabditida.

Genera:

- Ascaroterakis Vicente, 1965
- Echinomena
- Inglisonema Mawson, 1968
- Linstowinema Smales, 1997
- Madelinema Schmidt & Kuntz, 1971
- Morgascarida
- Morgascaridia Inglis, 1958
- Schneidernema Travassos, 1927
