= Aspidoderidae =

Scientific classification
- Domain: Eukaryota
- Kingdom: Animalia
- Phylum: Nematoda
- Class: Chromadorea
- Order: Rhabditida
- Family: Aspidoderidae

Family of spirurian roundworms

Aspidoderidae is a family of nematodes belonging to the order Rhabditida.

Genera:

- Aspidodera Railliet & Henry, 1912
- Cheloniheterakis Yamaguti, 1961
- Lauroia Proença, 1938
- Narsingiella Rao, 1978
- Nematomystes Sutton, Chabaud & Durette-Desset, 1980
- Pseudaspidodera
- Sexansodera Skrjabin & Schikhobalova, 1947
