= Maupasinidae =

Scientific classification
- Domain: Eukaryota
- Kingdom: Animalia
- Phylum: Nematoda
- Class: Chromadorea
- Order: Ascaridida
- Family: Maupasinidae

Synonyms
- Dubioxyuridae

Family of roundworms

Maupasinidae is a family of nematodes belonging to the order Ascaridida.

Genera:

- Maupasina Seurat, 1913
