= Ascaridiidae =

Scientific classification
- Kingdom: Animalia
- Phylum: Nematoda
- Class: Chromadorea
- Order: Rhabditida
- Infraorder: Ascaridomorpha
- Superfamily: Heterakoidea
- Family: Ascaridiidae; Travassos, 1919

Family of roundworms

Ascaridiidae is the name of a family of parasitic nematodes. The family includes roundworms belonging to a single genus Ascaridia. Members are essentially intestinal parasites of gallinaceous birds, including domestic fowl. A. galli is the most prevalent and pathogenic species, especially in domestic fowl. They cause the disease ascaridiasis in birds.
