= Raffaele Molin =

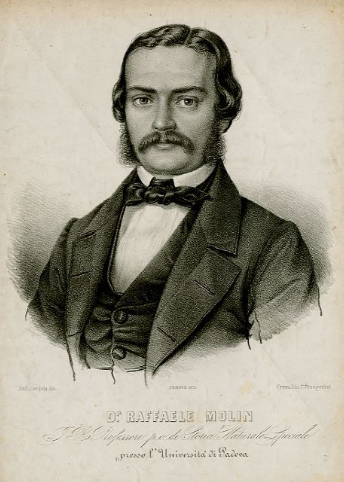
- Born: 27 October 1825; Zadar, Croatia
- Died: 29 June 1887 (aged 61); Vienna, Austria
- Citizenship: Italian
- Education: University of Vienna
- Known for: Helminth taxonomy
- Scientific career
- Fields: Parasitology, Zoology, Medicine, Geology
- Workplaces: University of Padua, 1951-1966; Vienna University of Technology, 1867-1875; Vienna College of Agriculture, 1885-1887
- Author abbrev. (zoology): Molin

Raffaele Molin (27 October 1825 – 29 June 1887) was an Italian scientist with successful career as medical doctor, zoologist, geologist. He is most revered for his works in ichthyology and parasitology, and he is also immortalised as the authority of a number of parasitic worms.

== Biography ==
=== Early life and education ===
He was born in Zadar, Croatia on 27 October 1825. His father was Ferdinand Astolfi and mother Margaret Trevisani. He studied medicine at the University of Vienna, from where he graduated in 1849.

=== Career and research ===
In 1851, shortly after the retirement of professor TA Catullus, he was appointed by the Austrian Government to be the successor as professor of natural sciences at the University of Padua. He started dual teaching in zoology and mineralogy on 4 February 1852. From 1856 he began to devote himself to research in ichthyology.

On 13 January 1856 he was elected as member of the Academy of Sciences, Letters and Arts in Padua. His research work centered at the provinces of Vienna, where he made his first contribution in helminthology. In 1858, he described for the first time a chicken parasite Capillaria annulata. Eventually in the spring of 1866, he moved to Vienna. In 1867, he was appointed by the Government of Vienna as professor of applied zoology at the Imperial-Royal Polytechnic Institute (now Vienna University of Technology). However, he remained there only up to January 1875. In 1878, he obtained the professional license as practitioner physician. He even opened a free clinic for the poor two days a week. From 1885 to 1887 he taught as a lecturer at the Vienna College of Agriculture, while maintaining a hobby of breeding of pets and aquatic animals.

He died in Vienna on 29 June, 1887.

== Taxa authored ==
- Aspidorhynchus (Molin, 1858)
- Capillaria annulata (Molin, 1858)
