= Cosmocercidae =

Scientific classification
- Domain: Eukaryota
- Kingdom: Animalia
- Phylum: Nematoda
- Class: Chromadorea
- Order: Rhabditida
- Superfamily: Cosmocercoidea
- Family: Cosmocercidae; Railliet, 1916

Family of roundworms

The Cosmocercidae are a nematode family in the superfamily Cosmoceroidea.

== Genera ==
Genera within the family Cosmocercidae include:

- Cosmocercoides Wilkie, 1930
- Nemhelix Morand & Petter, 1986 - with the only species Nemhelix bakeri Morand & Petter, 1986
- Aplectana, with 42 species, type: Aplectana herediaensis
