= Atractidae =

Scientific classification
- Kingdom: Animalia
- Phylum: Nematoda
- Class: Chromadorea
- Order: Rhabditida
- Family: Atractidae; Railliet, 1917

Synonyms
- Cobboldinidae; Crossocephalidae

Family of roundworms

Atractidae is a family of nematodes belonging to the order Rhabditida.

== Genera ==
Genera:

- Atractis Dujardin, 1845
- Buckleyatractis Khalil & Gibbons, 1988
- Cobboldina Leiper, 1911
- Crossocephalus Railliet, 1909
- Cyrtosomum Gedoelst, 1919
- Diceronema Gibbons, Knapp & Krecek, 1996
- Fitzsimmonsnema Petter, 1966
- Grassenema Petter, 1959
- Klossinemella Gonçalves da Costa, 1961
- Labeonema Puylaert, 1970
- Labiduris Schneider, 1866
- Leiperenia Khalil, 1922
- Monhysterides Baylis & Daubney, 1922
- Nouvelnema Petter, 1959
- Orientatractis Petter, 1966
- Paraorientatractis Gibbons, Khalil & Marinkelle, 1997
- Paratractis Sarmiento, 1959
- Pneumoatractis Bursey, Reavill & Greiner, 2009
- Podocnematractis Gibbons, Khalil & Marinkelle, 1995
- Probstmayria
- Pseudocyrtosomum Gupta & Johri, 1988
- Rhinoceronema Mondal & Manna, 2013
- Rhinoclemmysnema Gibbons & Platt, 2006
- Rondonia Travassos, 1920
