= Kathlaniidae =

Scientific classification
- Kingdom: Animalia
- Phylum: Nematoda
- Class: Chromadorea
- Order: Rhabditida
- Superfamily: Cosmocercoidea
- Family: Kathlaniidae; Lane, 1914

Family of roundworms

Kathlaniidae is a family of nematodes in the superfamily Cosmocercoidea.

== Subdivisions ==
- Genera within Kathlaniidae
  - Amblyonema Linstow, 1898
  - Cruzia Travassos, 1917
  - Myleusnema Moravec & Thatcher, 1996
  - Oniscicula Schwenk, 1927
  - Oxyascaris Travassos, 1920
  - Pseudocruzia Wolfgang, 1953
  - Pseudoxyascaris Uchida & Itagaki, 1979
  - Spectatus Travassos, 1923
  - Tonaudia Travassos, 1918
  - Urodelnema Baker, 1981
  - Tonaudia Travassos, 1918
- Subfamily Kathlaniinae Lane, 1914
  - Cissophyllus Railliet & Henry, 1912
  - Falcaustra Lane, 1915
  - Kathlania Lane, 1914
