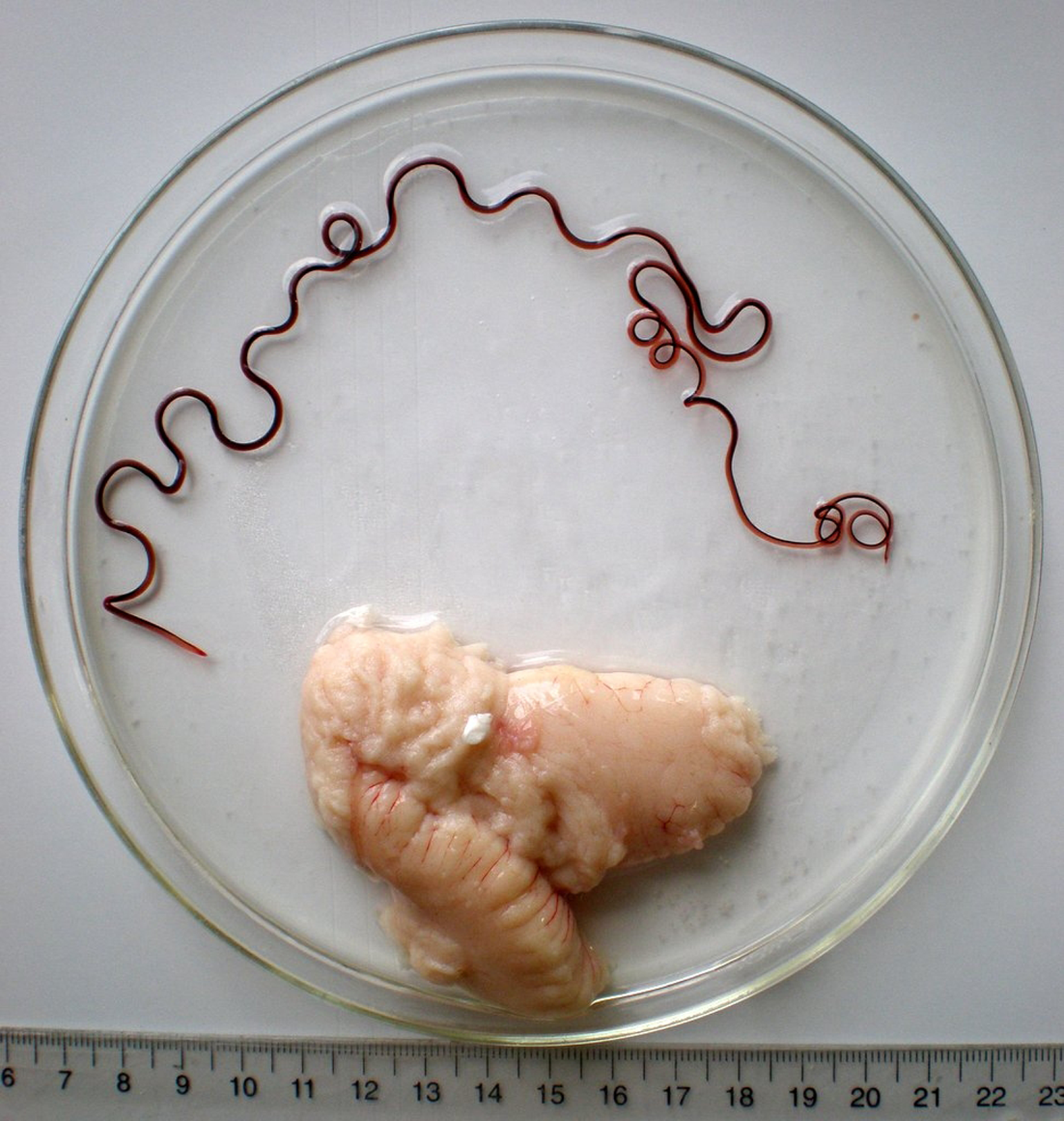
- Female Philometra fasciati (above) and ovary of Epinephelus fasciatus

Scientific classification
- Kingdom: Animalia
- Phylum: Nematoda
- Class: Secernentea
- Order: Camallanida
- Family: Philometridae
- Genus: Philometra
- Species: P. fasciati

Binomial name
- Philometra fasciati Moravec & Justine, 2008

= Philometra fasciati =

Species of roundworm

Philometra fasciati is a species of parasitic nematode of fishes, first found off New Caledonia in the South Pacific, in the gonads Epinephelus fasciatus. This species is characterized mainly by: length of spicules and length and structure of its gubernaculum; structure of male caudal end; body size; location in host and types of hosts.

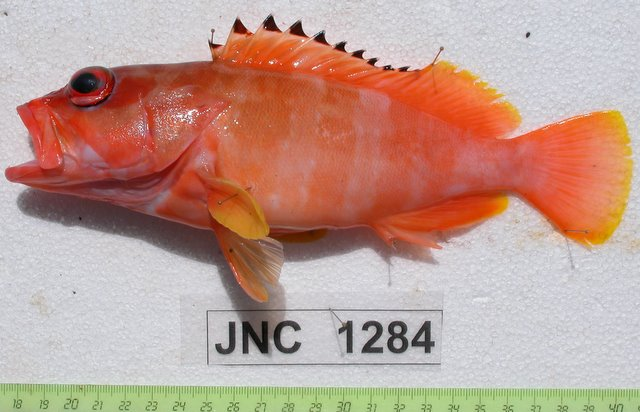
The blacktip grouper, Epinephelus fasciatus, is the host of Philometra fasciati
