= Philometra gerrei =

Scientific classification
- Kingdom: Animalia
- Phylum: Nematoda
- Class: Secernentea
- Order: Camallanida
- Family: Philometridae
- Genus: Philometra
- Species: P. gerrei

Binomial name
- Philometra gerrei Moravec & Manoharan, 2013

Species of roundworm

Philometra gerrei is a species of parasitic nematode of fishes, infecting the gonads of marine perciform fishes off the eastern Indian coast. It was first found in the whipfin silver-biddy, Gerres filamentosus. It is distinguished from its cogenerates by the gubernaculum structure in males, as well as the shape and structure of the females' cephalic and caudal ends, and their oesophagus.
