= Philometroides eleutheronemae =

Scientific classification
- Domain: Eukaryota
- Kingdom: Animalia
- Phylum: Nematoda
- Class: Secernentea
- Order: Camallanida
- Family: Philometridae
- Genus: Philometroides
- Species: P. eleutheronemae

Binomial name
- Philometroides eleutheronemae Moravec & Manoharan, 2013

Species of roundworm

Philometroides eleutheronemae is a species of parasitic nematode of fishes, infecting the gonads of marine perciform fishes off the eastern Indian coast. It was first found in the fourfinger threadfin, Eleutheronema tetradactylum. It is distinguished from its cogenerates by the gubernaculum structure in males, as well as the shape and structure of the females' cephalic and caudal ends, and their oesophagus.
