= Philometra lethrini =

Scientific classification
- Domain: Eukaryota
- Kingdom: Animalia
- Phylum: Nematoda
- Class: Secernentea
- Order: Camallanida
- Family: Philometridae
- Genus: Philometra
- Species: P. lethrini

Binomial name
- Philometra lethrini Moravec & Justine, 2008

Species of roundworm

Philometra lethrini is a species of parasitic nematode of fishes, first found off New Caledonia in the South Pacific, in the gonads of Lethrinus genivittatus. This species is characterized mainly by: length of spicules and length and structure of its gubernaculum, structure of male caudal end, body size, location in host and types of hosts.

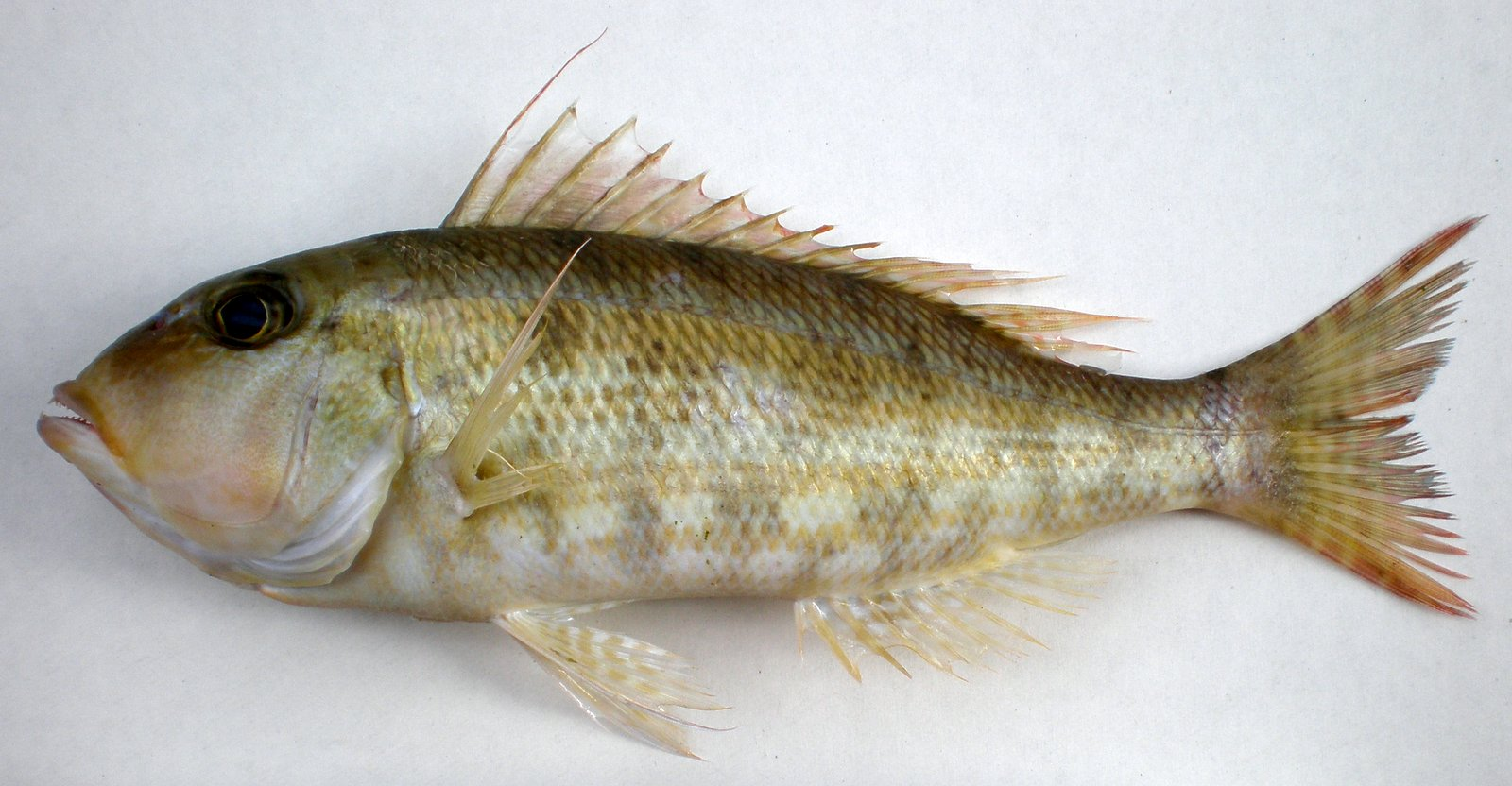
Lethrinus genivittatus is the host of Philometra lethrini
