= Philometra priacanthi =

Scientific classification
- Kingdom: Animalia
- Phylum: Nematoda
- Class: Secernentea
- Order: Camallanida
- Family: Philometridae
- Genus: Philometra
- Species: P. priacanthi

Binomial name
- Philometra priacanthi Moravec & Justine, 2009

Species of roundworm

Philometra priacanthi is a species of parasitic nematode of fishes. Its name is derived from its host species, Priacanthus hamrur. It possesses dorsal lamella-like structures on the distal part of its gubernaculum, which can also be found on other of its cogenerates. The only species with a dorsal protuberance near the gubernaculum's end is P. priacanthi, however. P. lateolabracis can be distinguished from the former by the lateral caudal mounds separated dorsally, narrower lamella-like structures on its gubernaculum, shorter spicules, and by the testis extending anteriorly. Other gonad-infecting species differ from this one by possessing a smooth gubernaculum, and their spicules being of different lengths. Seven gonad-infecting species of Philometra can be distinguished from P. priacanthi by their host types, as well as by geographical distribution.

== Description ==
This description is based on a male specimen. It presents a filiform, whitish body, measuring between 3.01 to 3.60 millimetres (0.119 to 0.142 in) long. It has a smooth cuticle, and a rounded cephalic end. It has a very small circular oral aperture circular, which is surrounded by 14 minute cephalic papillae arranged in two circles: and external one formed by 4 submedian pairs of papillae, and internal circle having 4 submedian and 2 lateral papillae. Its amphids are outlined; its oesophagus forms about 9–14% of its body length, and is slightly inflated at its anterior end; its posterior part (oesophagus) is overlapped by a large oesophageal gland with a substantial cell nucleus in the middle. Its excretory pore is located posterior to its nerve ring.

Its testis slightly exceeds anteriorly the posterior end of the oesophagus. The posterior end of its body counts with two lateral U-shaped mounds. Its spicules are slender and needle-like; the right spicule is longer than the left spicule or in some cases both spicules are equal in length. Its gubernaculum is narrow and long, with its proximal half being dorsally bent. The distal part of the gubernaculum possesses a transverse lamella-like structure on its dorsal side. The spicules and gubernaculum are well sclerotized, which are orange-coloured, the anterior part of which is colourless.

== Distribution ==
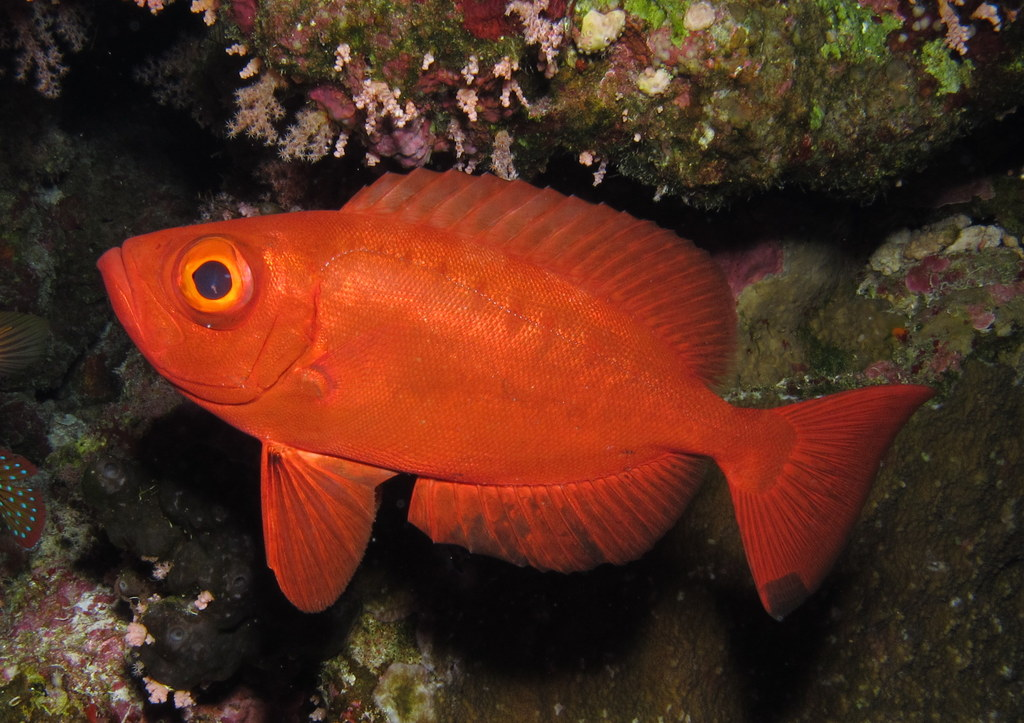
The Moontail bullseye, Priacanthus hamrur, is the host of Philometra priacanthi

The type host of this parasite is the Moontail bullseye, Priacanthus hamrur, at its gonads. Its type locality is off Nouméa, in New Caledonia.
