= Philometra cyanopodi =

Scientific classification
- Domain: Eukaryota
- Kingdom: Animalia
- Phylum: Nematoda
- Class: Secernentea
- Order: Camallanida
- Family: Philometridae
- Genus: Philometra
- Species: P. cyanopodi

Binomial name
- Philometra cyanopodi Moravec & Justine, 2008

Species of roundworm

Philometra cyanopodi is a species of parasitic nematode of fishes, first found off New Caledonia in the South Pacific, in the gonads of Epinephelus cyanopodus. This species is characterized mainly by: length of spicules and length and structure of its gubernaculum; structure of male caudal end; body size; location in host and types of hosts.

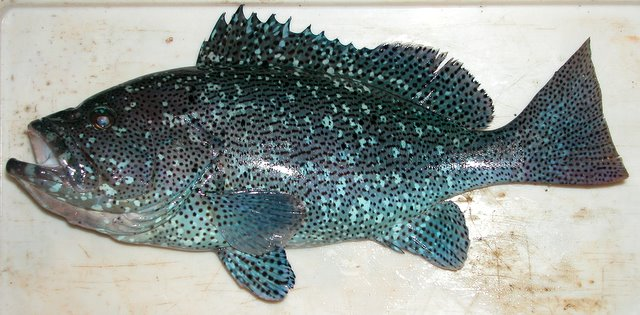
The Speckled blue grouper (Epinephelus cyanopodus) is the host of Philometra cyanopodi
