= Philometra otolithi =

Scientific classification
- Domain: Eukaryota
- Kingdom: Animalia
- Phylum: Nematoda
- Class: Secernentea
- Order: Camallanida
- Family: Philometridae
- Genus: Philometra
- Species: P. otolithi

Binomial name
- Philometra otolithi Moravec & Manoharan, 2013

Species of roundworm

Philometra otolithi is a species of parasitic nematode of fishes, infecting the gonads of marine perciform fishes off the eastern Indian coast. It was first found in the tigertooth croaker, Otolithes ruber. It is distinguished from its cogenerates by the gubernaculum structure in males, as well as the shape and structure of the females' cephalic and caudal ends, and their oesophagus.
