= Camallanus lacustris =

Scientific classification
- Domain: Eukaryota
- Kingdom: Animalia
- Phylum: Nematoda
- Class: Secernentea
- Order: Camallanida
- Family: Camallanidae
- Genus: Camallanus
- Species: C. lacustris

Binomial name
- Camallanus lacustris (Zoega, 1776)

Synonyms
- Cucullanus elegans Zschokke, 1884; Cucullanus elegans Sramek, 1901; Cucullanus elegans Levander, 1926; Cucullanus elegans Ruszkowski, 1926; Camallanus elegans MacCallum, 1918

Species of roundworm

Camallanus lacustris is a species of freshwater parasitic roundworm in the family Camallanidae. Definitive hosts are fish and intermediate hosts are copepods.
