= Philometra sphyraenae =

Scientific classification
- Domain: Eukaryota
- Kingdom: Animalia
- Phylum: Nematoda
- Class: Secernentea
- Order: Camallanida
- Family: Philometridae
- Genus: Philometra
- Species: P. sphyraenae

Binomial name
- Philometra sphyraenae Moravec & Manoharan, 2013

Species of roundworm

Philometra sphyraenae is a species of parasitic nematode of fishes, infecting the gonads of marine perciform fishes off the eastern Indian coast. It was first found in the pickhandle barracuda, Sphyraena jello. It is distinguished from its cogenerates by the gubernaculum structure in males, as well as the shape and structure of the females' cephalic and caudal ends, and their oesophagus.
