= Philometra lagocephali =

Scientific classification
- Domain: Eukaryota
- Kingdom: Animalia
- Phylum: Nematoda
- Class: Secernentea
- Order: Camallanida
- Family: Philometridae
- Genus: Philometra
- Species: P. lagocephali

Binomial name
- Philometra lagocephali Moravec & Justine, 2008

Species of roundworm

Philometra lagocephali is a species of parasitic nematode of fishes, first found off New Caledonia in the South Pacific Ocean in the abdominal cavity of Lagocephalus sceleratus. This species is characterized mainly by the length of its spicules, length and structure of its gubernaculum, body size, location in host and types of hosts.
