= Levamisole =

Chemical compound

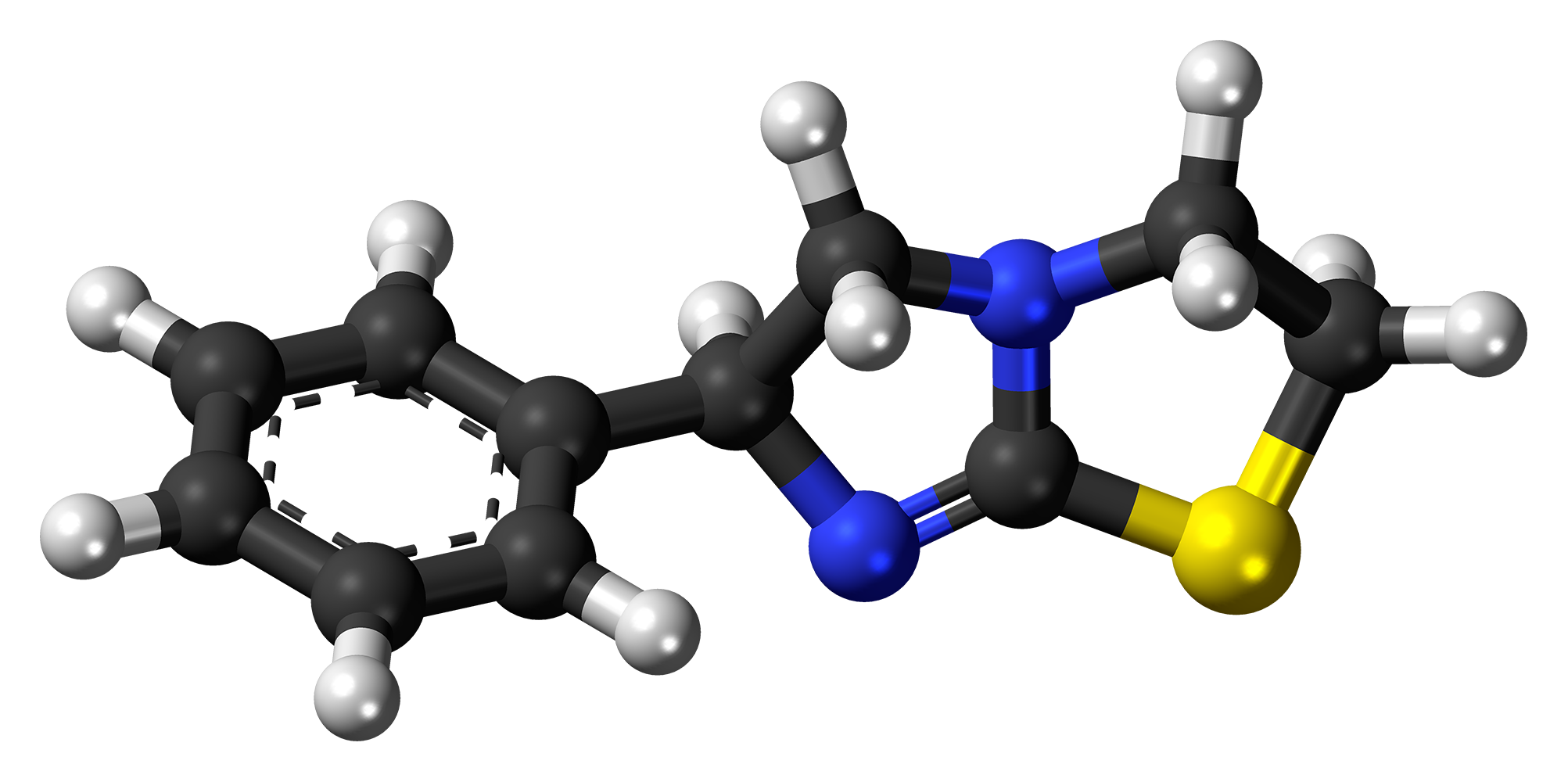

Clinical data
- Trade names: Ergamisol, others
- AHFS/Drugs.com: Micromedex Detailed Consumer Information
- MedlinePlus: a697011
- License data: US DailyMed: Levamisole
- Routes of administration: By mouth
- ATC code: P02CE01 (WHO) QP52AE01 (WHO)

Legal status
- Legal status: Rx-only (RU)

Pharmacokinetic data
- Metabolism: Liver
- Elimination half-life: 3–4 hours
- Excretion: Kidney (70%)

Identifiers
- IUPAC name: (S)-6-Phenyl-2,3,5,6-tetrahydroimidazo[2,1-b] [1,3]thiazole
- CAS Number: 14769-73-4
- PubChem CID: 26879
- IUPHAR/BPS: 7210
- DrugBank: DB00848
- ChemSpider: 25037
- UNII: 2880D3468G
- KEGG: D08114
- ChEBI: CHEBI:6432
- ChEMBL: ChEMBL1454
- CompTox Dashboard (EPA): DTXSID4023206
- ECHA InfoCard: 100.035.290

Chemical and physical data
- Formula: C_{11}H_{12}N_{2}S
- Molar mass: 204.29 g·mol^{−1}
- 3D model (JSmol): Interactive image
- Density: 1.31 g/cm^{3}
- Melting point: 60 °C (140 °F)
- Solubility in water: 210hydrochloride
- SMILES: N\2=C1/SCCN1C[C@@H]/2c3ccccc3
- InChI: InChI=1S/C11H12N2S/c1-2-4-9(5-3-1)10-8-13-6-7-14-11(13)12-10/h1-5,10H,6-8H2/t10-/m1/s1; Key:HLFSDGLLUJUHTE-SNVBAGLBSA-N

Levamisole, sold under the brand name Ergamisol among others, is a medication used to treat parasitic worm infections, specifically ascariasis and hookworm infections. It is taken by mouth.

Side effects may include abdominal pain, vomiting, headache, and dizziness. Use is not recommended during breastfeeding or the third trimester of pregnancy. Serious side effects may include an increased risk of infection. It belongs to the anthelmintic class of medications.

Levamisole was invented in 1966 in Belgium by Janssen Pharmaceuticals. It is on the World Health Organization's List of Essential Medicines. Levamisole is also used as a dewormer for cattle. It is also often used as a cutting agent in illegal cocaine.

In February 2026, the Pharmacovigilance Risk Assessment Committee of the European Medicines Agency recommended that medicines containing levamisole be withdrawn from the EU market. This follows an EU-wide review which concluded that the benefits of these medicines no longer outweigh their risks for the treatment of parasitic worm infections in adults and children.

== Medical uses ==
=== Worms ===
Levamisole was originally used as an anthelmintic to treat worm infestations in both humans and animals. Levamisole works as a nicotinic acetylcholine receptor agonist that causes continued stimulation of the parasitic worm muscles, leading to paralysis. Levamisole has gained prominence among aquarists as an effective treatment for Camallanus roundworm infestations in freshwater tropical fish. Levamisole has been used to treat small ruminant animals since the late 1960s. Levamisole-resistant parasitic worms are common in sheep farms in New Zealand, Uruguay, Paraguay, and Brazil.

=== Other ===
Levamisole has been used to treat a variety of dermatologic conditions, including skin infections, leprosy, warts, lichen planus, and aphthous ulcers.

An interesting side effect these reviewers reported in passing was "neurologic excitement". Later papers, from the Janssen group and others, indicate levamisole and its enantiomer, dexamisole, have some mood-elevating or antidepressant properties, although this was never a marketed use of the drug.

== Adverse effects ==
One of the more serious side effects of levamisole is agranulocytosis, or the depletion of the white blood cells. In particular, neutrophils appear to be affected the most. This occurs in 0.08–5% of the studied populations.

It has been used as an adulterant in cocaine, resulting in serious side effects that present as levamisole induced necrosis syndrome, in which erythematous painful papules can appear almost anywhere on skin.

In September 2025, the Pharmacovigilance Risk Assessment Committee (PRAC) of the European Medicines Agency started a review of medicines containing levamisole, authorized in four countries of the European Union to treat infections caused by parasitic worms in adults and children. The review follows concerns about a risk of leukoencephalopathy with levamisole, a potentially serious condition that damages the white matter of the brain. White matter is made of nerve fibres covered by a protective layer called myelin, which allows efficient communication between different parts of the brain. Leukoencephalopathy can be life-threatening and debilitating, especially when left undiagnosed or untreated. It may lead to a range of neurological symptoms, including but not limited to, confusion, weakness or impaired muscle function, difficulties with movement coordination, and impaired or lost speech or vision. Leukoencephalopathy has already been identified as a potential risk with levamisole, and the product information of levamisole medicines include the general term encephalopathy (a group of brain dysfunction conditions).

In February 2026, the PRAC recommended that medicines containing levamisole be withdrawn from the EU market. This follows an EU-wide review which concluded that the benefits of these medicines no longer outweigh their risks for the treatment of parasitic worm infections in adults and children.

== Metabolism ==
Levamisole is readily absorbed from the gastrointestinal tract and metabolized in the liver. Its time to peak plasma concentration is 1.5–2 hours. The plasma elimination half-life is fairly quick at 3–4 hours which can contribute to not detecting levamisole intoxication. The metabolite half-life is 16 hours. Levamisole's excretion is primarily through the kidneys, with about 70% being excreted over 3 days. Only about 5% is excreted as unchanged levamisole.

Drug testing of racehorse urine has led to the revelation that among levamisole equine metabolites are both pemoline and aminorex, stimulants that are forbidden by racing authorities. Further testing confirmed aminorex in human and canine urine, meaning that both humans and dogs also metabolize levamisole into aminorex, though it is unclear whether plasma aminorex is present at any appreciable level. Blood samples following oral administration of levamisole out to 172 hr post-dose did not demonstrate any plasma aminorex levels above that of the limit of quantification (LoQ). Additionally, in cocaine-positive plasma samples, of which 42% contained levamisole, aminorex was never reported at concentrations higher than LoQ.

== Detection in body fluids ==
Levamisole may be quantified in blood, plasma, or urine as a diagnostic tool in clinical poisoning situations or to aid in the medicolegal investigation of suspicious deaths involving adulterated street drugs. About 3% of an oral dose is eliminated unchanged in the 24-hour urine of humans. A post mortem blood levamisole concentration of 2.2 mg/L was present in a woman who died of a cocaine overdose.

== Adulterant in illegal drugs ==
In the body, levamisole is converted into aminorex, a substance with amphetamine-like stimulant effects and a long duration of action.

Beginning in early 2003, South American cartels started adding levamisole to bulk cocaine before shipping it to the United States (Valentino and Fuentecilla 2005).

Levamisole has increasingly been used as a cutting agent in cocaine sold around the globe with the highest incidence being in the United States. In 2008–2009, levamisole was found in 69% of cocaine samples seized by the Drug Enforcement Administration (DEA). By April 2011, the DEA reported the adulterant was found in 82% of seizures. By October 2017, this figure had risen further, with the DEA reporting that 87% of seized and analyzed cocaine bricks in the United States contained levamisole, making it the most common adulterant in cocaine at that time.

Levamisole adds bulk and weight to powdered cocaine (whereas other adulterants produce smaller "rocks" of cocaine) and makes the drug appear purer. In a series of investigative articles for The Stranger, Brendan Kiley details other rationales for levamisole's rise as an adulterant: possible stimulant effects, a similar appearance to cocaine, and an ability to pass street purity tests.

Levamisole suppresses the production of white blood cells, resulting in neutropenia and agranulocytosis. With the increasing use of levamisole as an adulterant, a number of these complications have been reported among cocaine users. Levamisole has also been linked to a risk of vasculitis, and two cases of vasculitic skin necrosis have been reported in users of cocaine adulterated with levamisole.

== Chemistry ==
The original synthesis at Janssen Pharmaceutica resulted in the preparation of a racemic mixture of two enantiomers, whose hydrochloride salt was reported to have a melting point of 264–265 °C; the free base of the racemate has a melting point of 87–89 °C. The racemic mixture is referred to as "tetramisole" - levamisole refers only to the levorotatory enantiomer of tetramisole.

== Toxicity ==
The LD_{50} (intravenous, mouse) is 22 mg/kg.

== Laboratory use ==
Levamisole reversibly and uncompetitively inhibits most isoforms of alkaline phosphatase (e.g., human liver, bone, kidney, and spleen) except the intestinal and placental isoform. It is thus used as an inhibitor along with substrate to reduce background alkaline phosphatase activity in biomedical assays involving detection signal amplification by intestinal alkaline phosphatase, for example in in situ hybridization or Western blot protocols.

It is used to immobilize the nematode C. elegans on glass slides for imaging and dissection.

In a C. elegans behavioral assay, analyzing the time course of paralysis provides information about the neuromuscular junction. Levamisole acts as an acetylcholine receptor agonist, which leads to muscle contraction. Continuing activation leads to paralysis. The time course of paralysis provides information about the acetylcholine receptors on the muscle. For example, mutants with fewer acetylcholine receptors may paralyze slower than wild type.

== Research ==
It has been studied as a method to stimulate the immune system as part of the treatment of cancer. It has also shown some efficacy in the treatment of nephrotic syndrome in children.

After being pulled from the market in the US and Canada in 1999 and 2003, respectively, levamisole has been tested in combination with fluorouracil to treat colon cancer. Evidence from clinical trials support its addition to fluorouracil therapy to benefit patients with colon cancer. In some of the leukemic cell line studies, both levamisole and tetramisole showed similar effect.

== Veterinary uses ==
The combination doramectin/levamisole, sold under the brand name Valcor, is indicated for the treatment and control of gastrointestinal roundworms, lungworms, grubs, sucking lice, and mange mites in cattle. It is given by subcutaneous injection.
