= Philometroides =

Scientific classification
- Domain: Eukaryota
- Kingdom: Animalia
- Phylum: Nematoda
- Class: Secernentea
- Order: Camallanida
- Family: Philometridae
- Genus: Philometroides; Yamaguti, 1935

Genus of roundworms

Philometroides is a genus of nematodes belonging to the family Philometridae.

The species of this genus are found in Europe and Northern America.

Species:

- Philometroides acreanensis Cavalcante, Moravec & Santos, 2017
- Philometroides atropi (Parukhin, 1966) Moravec & Ergens, 1970
- Philometroides barbi Moravec, Simkova & Hanzelova, 2005
- Philometroides branchiarum Moravec & Barton, 2016
- Philometroides branchiostegi Moravec, Nagasawa & Nohara, 2012
- Philometroides cyprini (Ishii, 1931)
- Philometroides denticulatus Rasheed, 1965
- Philometroides dogieli Vismanis & Juhimenko, 1974
- Philometroides eleutheronemae Moravec & Manoharan, 2013
- Philometroides grandipapillatus Moravec & Bakenhaster, 2010
- Philometroides huronensis Uhazy, 1976
- Philometroides indonesiensis Moravec, Walter & Yuniar, 2012
- Philometroides maplestoni (Travassos, Artigas & Pereira, 1928)
- Philometroides moraveci Vismanis & Yunchis, 1994
- Philometroides nodulosus (Thomas, 1929) Dailey, 1967
- Philometroides oveni Parukhin, 1975
- Philometroides paralichthydis Moravec & de Buron, 2006
- Philometroides seriolae (Ishii, 1931) Yamaguti, 1935
- Philometroides stomachicus Moravec & Barton, 2016
- Philometroides tahieli Montes, Plaul & Martorelli, 2016
- Philometroides trichiuri Moravec, Walter & Yuniar, 2012
