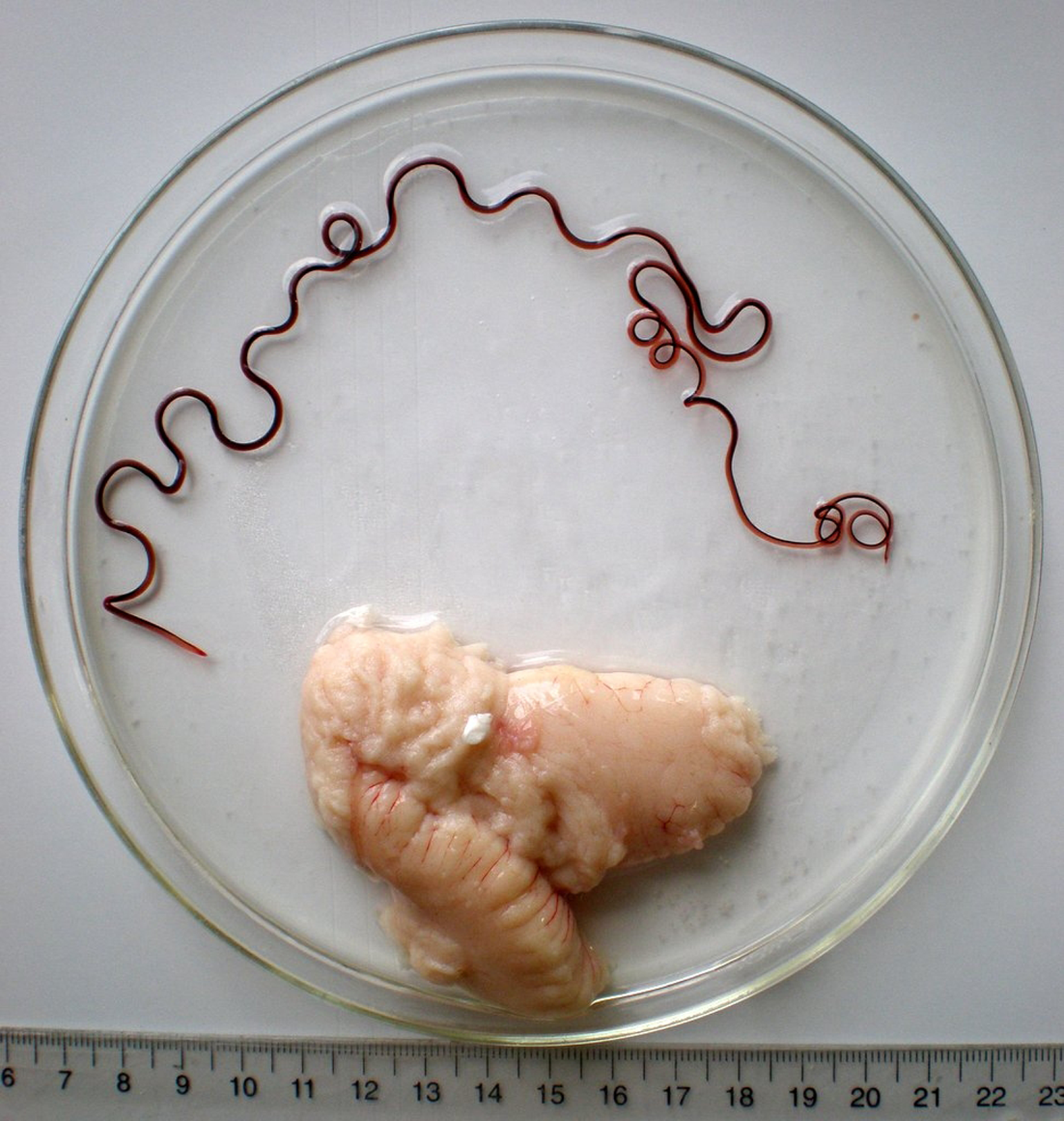
- Philometra fasciati

Scientific classification
- Kingdom: Animalia
- Phylum: Nematoda
- Class: Secernentea
- Order: Camallanida
- Family: Philometridae
- Genus: Philometra; Costa, 1845

Species
- See text

= Philometra =

Genus of roundworms

Philometra is a genus of nematodes, which are parasites of marine and freshwater fishes. The genus was erected by Oronzio Gabriele Costa in 1845.

Species in this genus are worldwide. They parasitize the body cavities, tissues and ovaries of both marine and freshwater fishes. When still in the larval stages, these worms move to the body cavities or subcutaneous tissues in the host. This migration can cause damage to skeletal joints, result in internal bleeding, and inflame visceral organs. Emaciation and lowered growth rates may result from this.

Infestation produces nodules under the skin. When the worms are in the adult or juvenile stage, these nodules may be visible between the rays of the fins or may cause the scales to raise up. Larger nodules may be the result of gravid females which may rupture the skin surface. Once ruptured, the female parasite disintegrates. This allows the release of the live larvae into the water. This wound on the fish then heals, leaving almost no scarring.

Species of Philometra require two hosts to complete their life cycle. After the larval worms are released from the host fish, they are ingested by copepods which act as an intermediate host. Once inside the copepod, the larvae molt several times. Fish may then eat the infested copepod.

== Known hosts ==
Species of this genus are known to parasitize numerous species of fish, including:

- Blacktip grouper
- Herring scad
- Bigeye scad
- Bluefish

== Gallery ==
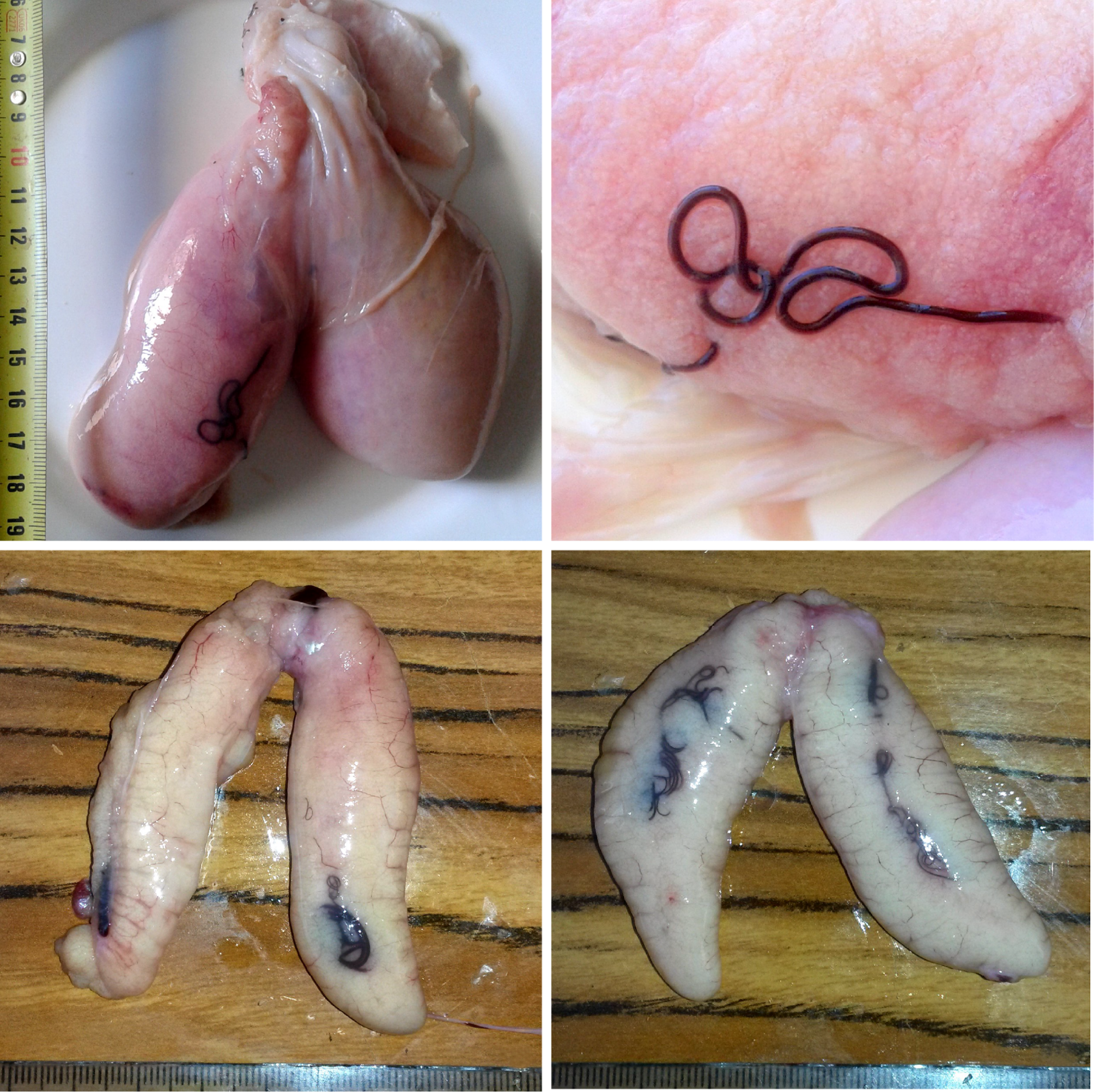
Ovary of fish with visible Philometra females

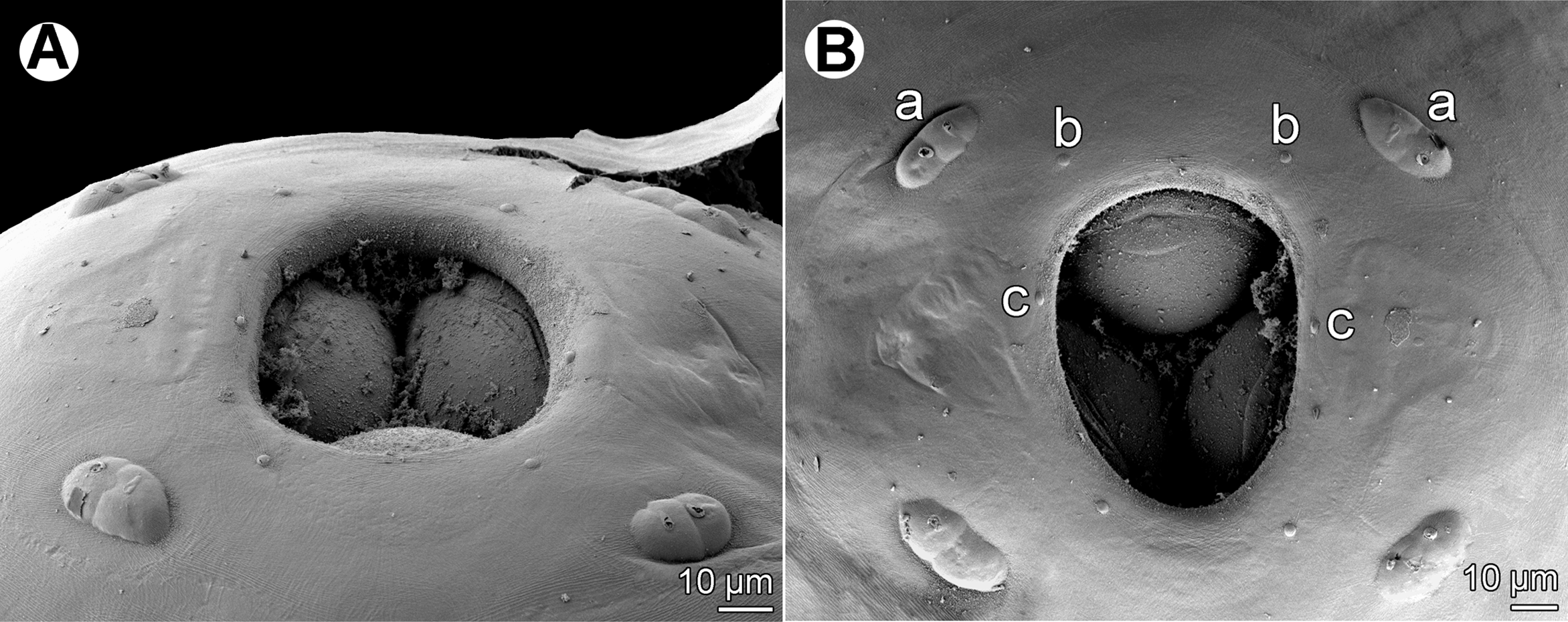
Philometra fasciati

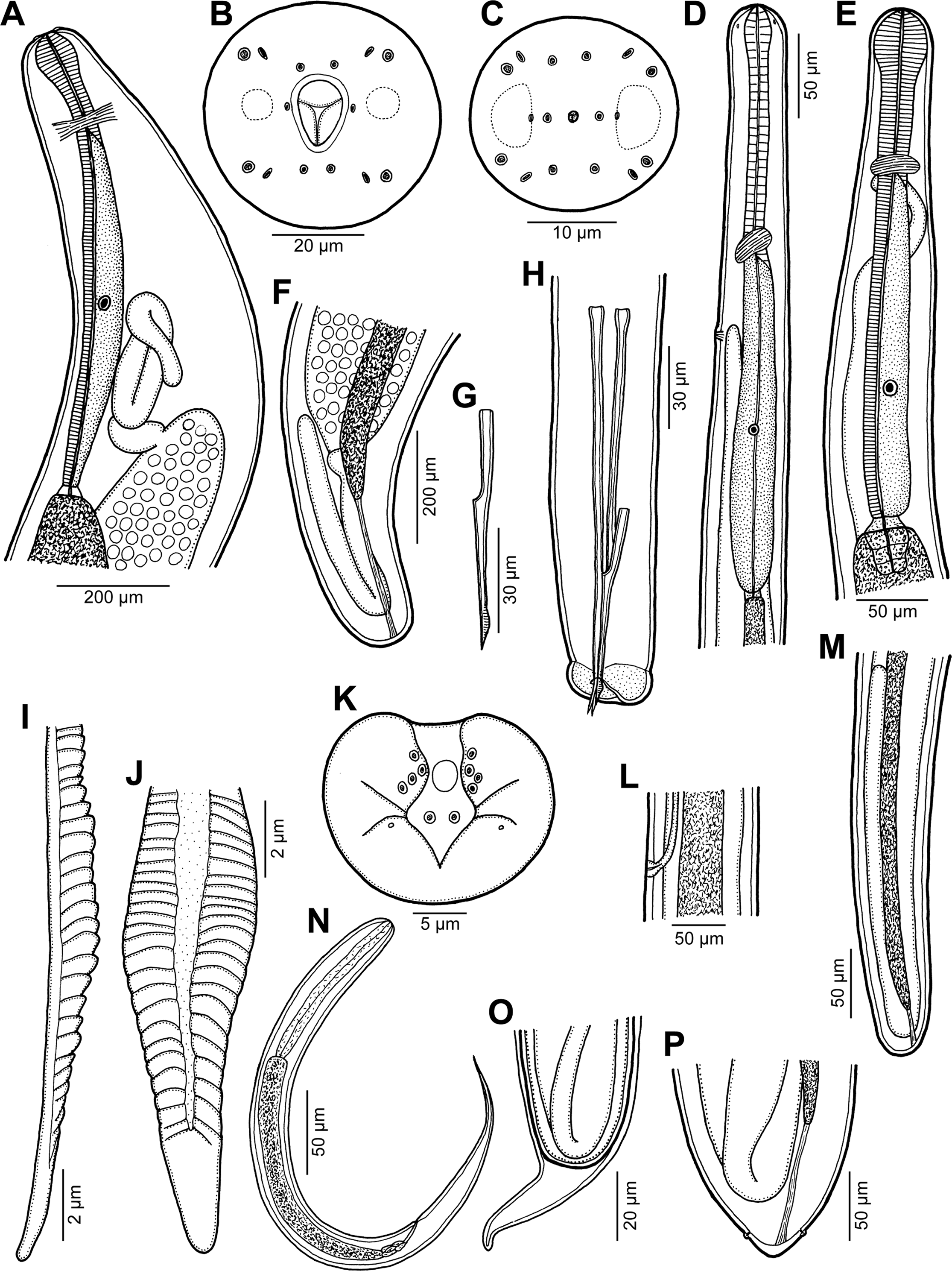
Philometra austropacifica

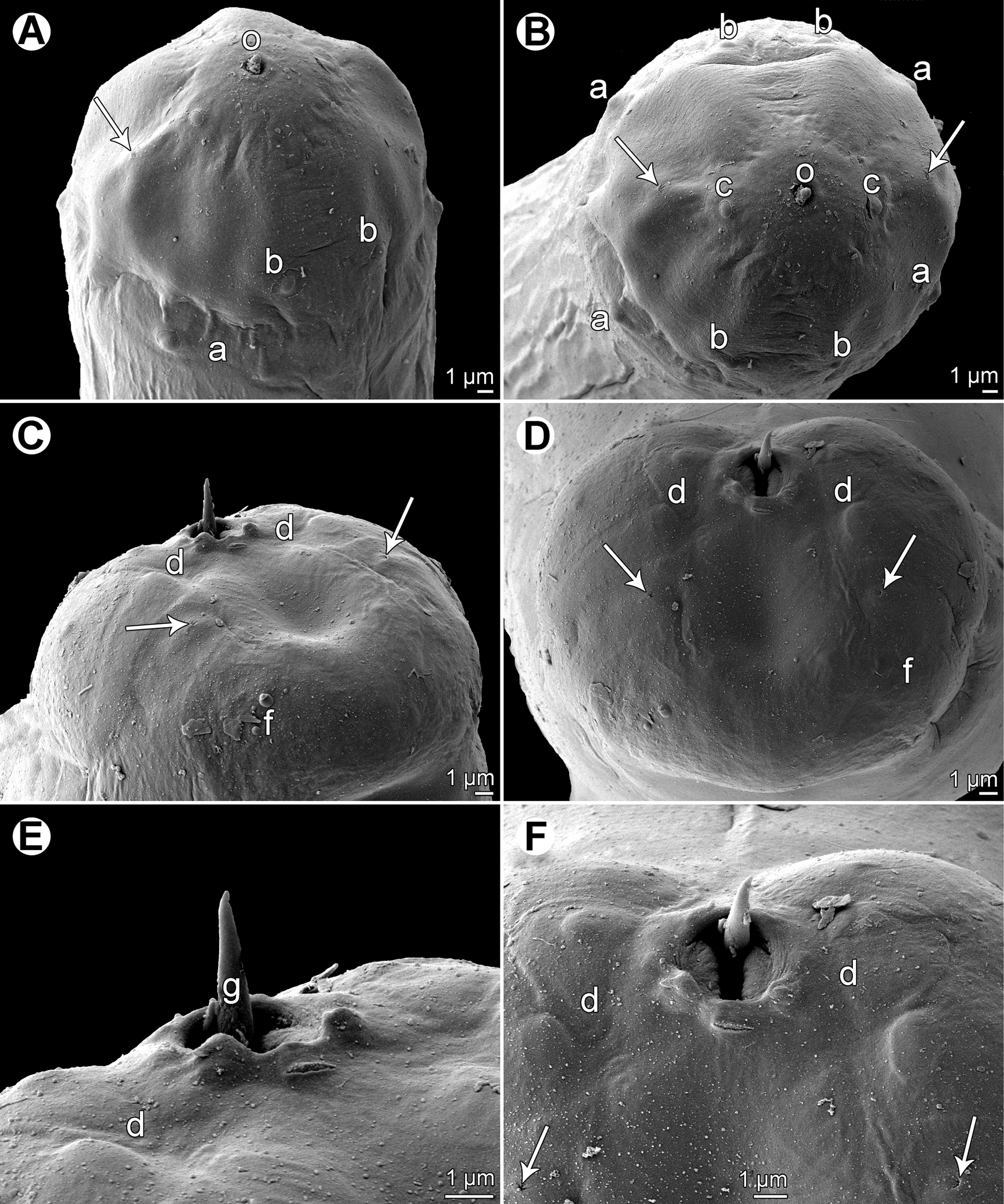
Philometra selaris

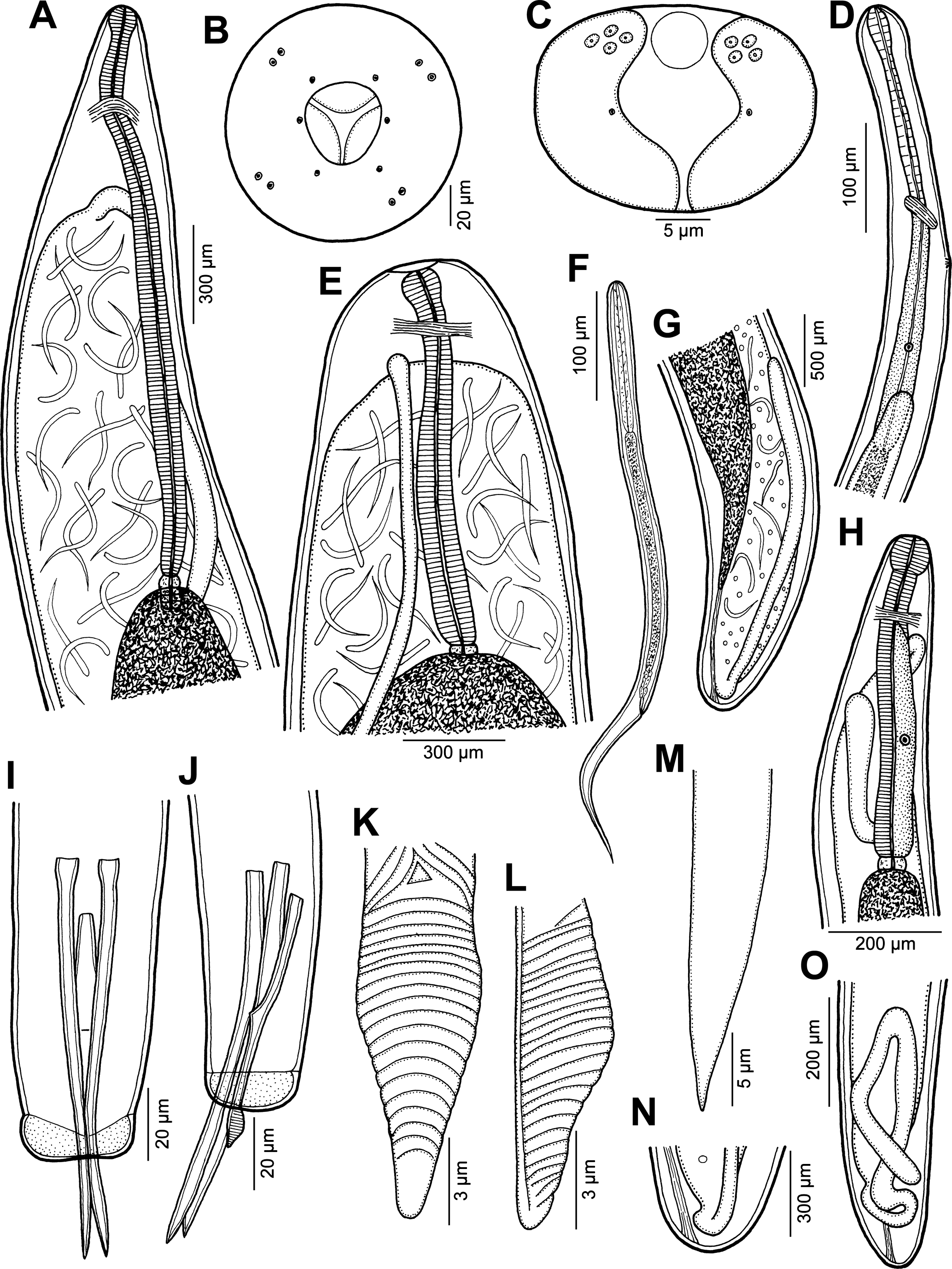
Philometra protonibeae

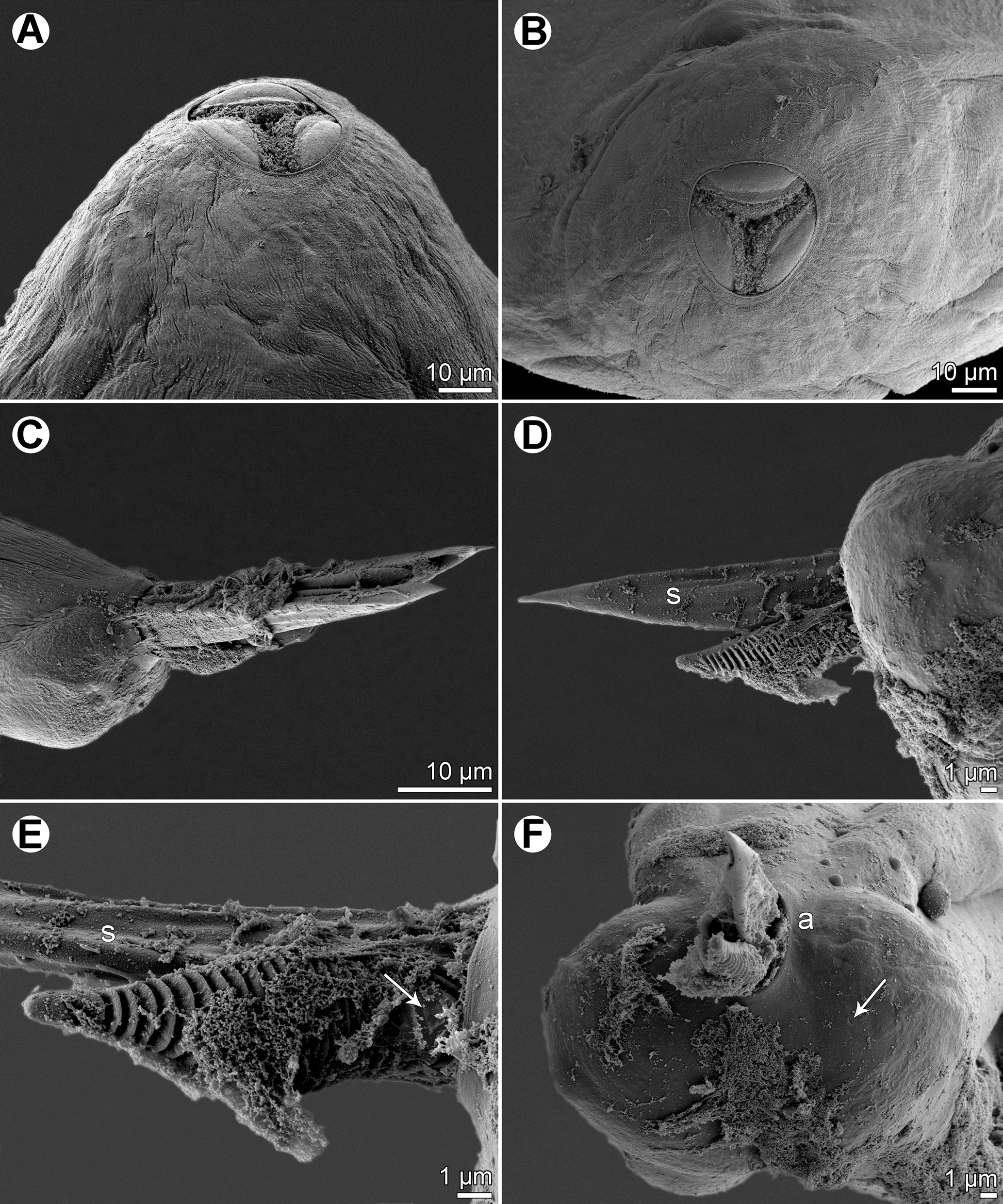
Philometra protonibeae

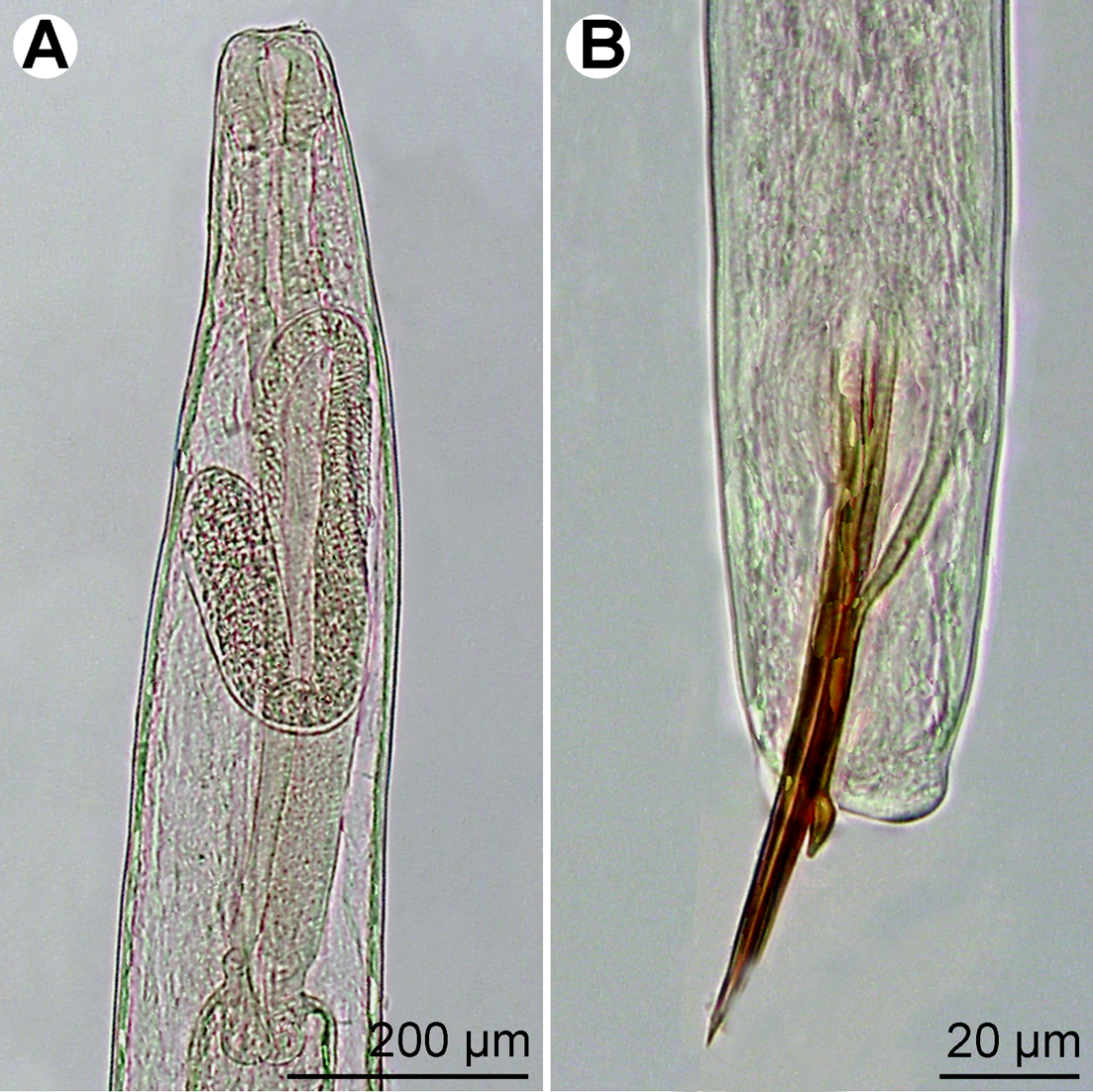
Philometra protonibeae

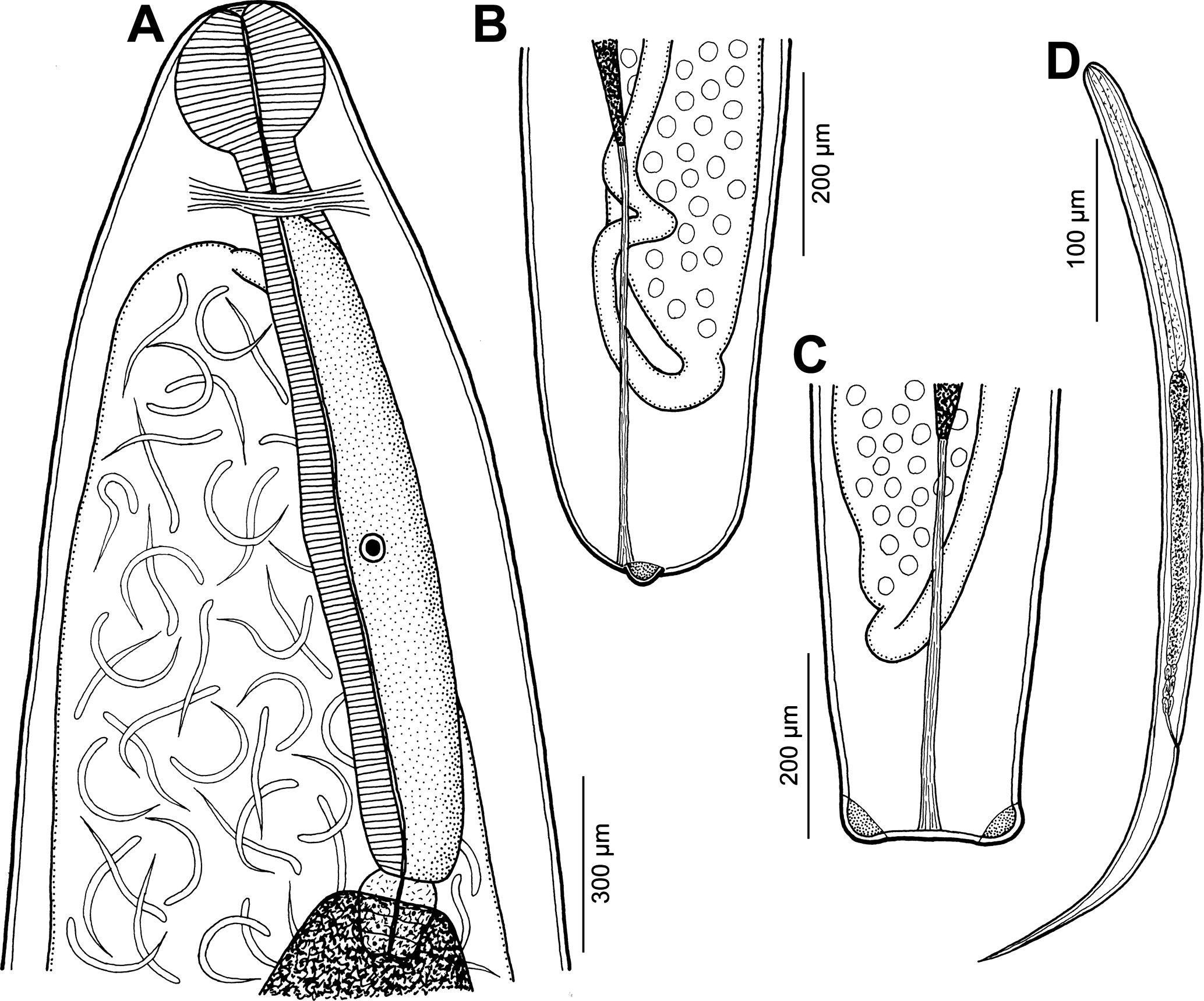
Philometra sp.

== Taxonomy ==
The following species are recognized by the World Register of Marine Species:

- Philometra gerrei Moravec & Manoharan, 2013
- Philometra globiceps (Rudolphi, 1819)
- Philometra lagocephali Moravec & Justine, 2008
- Philometra onchorhynchi Kuitinen-Ekbaum, 1933
- Philometra otolithi Moravec & Manoharan, 2013
- Philometra ovata (Zeder, 1803)
- Philometra priacanthi Moravec & Justine, 2009
- Philometra rischta Skrjabin, 1917
- Philometra rubra (Leidy, 1856)
- Philometra saltatrix Ramachandran, 1973
- Philometra sanguinea (Rudolphi, 1819)
- Philometra scombresoxis Nikolaeva & Naidenova, 1964
- Philometra sphyraenae Moravec & Manoharan, 2013
- Philometra tauridica Ivashkin, Naidenova, Kovaleva & Khromova, 1971
- Philometra translucida Walton, 1927

=== Nomina dubia ===
- Philometra brevicollis Moravec & Justine, 2011
- Philometra carolinensis Moravec, de Buron & Roumillat, 2006
- Philometra cephalus Ramachandran, 1975
- Philometra charlestonensis Moravec, de Buron, Baker & González-Solís, 2008
- Philometra cyanopodi Moravec & Justine, 2008
- Philometra cynoscionis Moravec, de Buron & Roumillat, 2006
- Philometra fasciati Moravec & Justine, 2008
- Philometra filiformis (Stossich, 1896)
- Philometra floridensis Moravec, Fajer-Avila & Bakenhaster, 2010
- Philometra genypteri Moravec, Chávez & Olivia, 2011
- Philometra gymnothoracis Moravec & Buron, 2009
- Philometra inimici Yamaguti, 1941
- Philometra isaki Quiazon, Yoshinaga & Ogawa, 2008
- Philometra jordanoi (López-Neyra, 1951)
- Philometra justinei Moravec, Ternengo & Levron, 2006
- Philometra katsuwoni Petter & Baudin-Laurencin, 1986
- Philometra lateolabracis (Yamaguti, 1935)
- Philometra lethrini Moravec & Justine, 2008
- Philometra macroandri (Shchepkina, 1978)
- Philometra madai Quiazon, Yoshinaga & Ogawa, 2008
- Philometra managatuwo Yamaguti, 1941
- Philometra margolisi Moravec, et al., 1995
- Philometra mexicana Moravec & Salgado-Maldonado, 2007
- Philometra mira Moravec & Justine, 2011
- Philometra nemipteri Luo, 2001
- Philometra neolateolabracis Rajyalakshmi, Hanumantha Rao & Shyamasundari, 1985
- Philometra neptomeni Mateo, 1972
- Philometra obladae Moravec, Gaglio, Panebianco & Giannetto, 2008
- Philometra obturans (Prennant, 1886)
- Philometra ocularis Moravec, Ogawa, Suzuki, Miyazaki & Donai, 2002
- Philometra overstreeti Moravec & de Buron, 2006
- Philometra pellucida (Jägerskiöld, 1893)
- Philometra rajani Mukherjee, 1963
- Philometra sciaenae Yamaguti, 1941
- Philometra scomberomori (Yamaguti, 1935)
- Philometra sebastisci Yamaguti, 1941
- Philometra serranellicabrillae Janiszewska, 1949
- Philometra strongylurae Moravec & Ali, 2005
- Philometra tenuicauda Moravec & Justine, 2009
- Philometra terapontis Moravec, Gopalakrishnan, Rajkumar, Saravanakumar & Kaliyamoorthy, 2011
- Philometra tylosuri Moravec & Ali, 2005
