= Procamallanus =

Scientific classification
- Domain: Eukaryota
- Kingdom: Animalia
- Phylum: Nematoda
- Class: Secernentea
- Order: Camallanida
- Family: Camallanidae
- Genus: Procamallanus; Baylis, 1923

Genus of roundworms

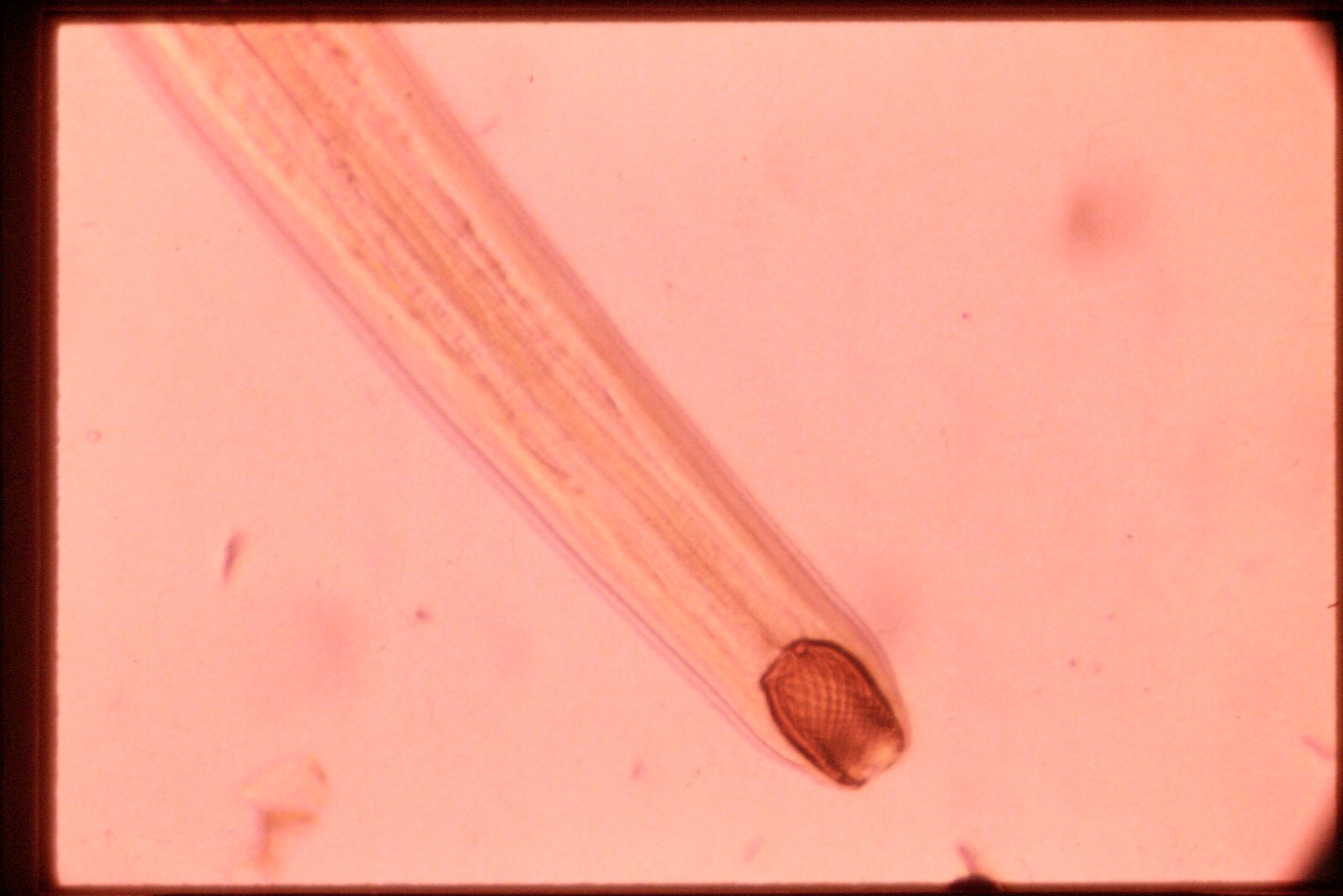
Procamallanus sp. on Tandanus tandanus

Procamallanus is a genus of nematodes belonging to the family Camallanidae.

The genus has almost cosmopolitan distribution.

Species:

- Procamallanus alii Kalyankar, 1971
- Procamallanus anguillae Moravec, Taraschewski, Thairungroj Anantaphruti, Maipanich & Laoprasert, 2006
- Procamallanus annipetterae Kohn & Fernandes, 1988
- Procamallanus annulatus Yamaguti, 1955
- Procamallanus ashouri (El-Abdou, Heckmann & Gardner, 2001)
- Procamallanus barlowi Santacruz, Barluenga & Pérez-Ponce de León, 2021
- Procamallanus belenensis Giese, Santos & Lanfredi, 2009
- Procamallanus berdii (Khan & Yaseen, 1969)
- Procamallanus bothi Moravec & Justine, 2019
- Procamallanus brevis Kung, 1948
- Procamallanus caballeroi (Bashirullah, 1977)
- Procamallanus caranxi Rajyalakshmi & Hanumantha Rao, 1993
- Procamallanus chaimha Moravec, Prouza & Royero, 1997
- Procamallanus chetumalensis Gonzalez-Solis, Moravec & Vidal-Martinez, 2002
- Procamallanus colei Rigby & Adanson, 1997
- Procamallanus crossorhombi (Zaidi & Khan, 1975)
- Procamallanus cruzi Guimarães, Cristófaro & Rodrigues, 1976
- Procamallanus cumanensis (Bashirullah, 1977)
- Procamallanus diacanthum Rajyalakshmi, 1994
- Procamallanus dispar Moravec & Justine, 2019
- Procamallanus ditchelli (Gupta & Garg, 1976)
- Procamallanus dussumieri Bilqees, Khanum & Jehan, 1971
- Procamallanus elatensis Fusco & Overstreet, 1979
- Procamallanus garnotus (Bashirullah & Williams, 1980)
- Procamallanus gobiomori Moravec, Salgado-Maldonado & Caspeta-Mandujano, 2000
- Procamallanus guttatusi (Andrade-Salas, Pineda-López & García-Magaña, 1994)
- Procamallanus halitrophus (Fusco & Overstreet, 1978) Cárdenas & Lanfredi, 2005
- Procamallanus hexophtalmatis Moravec & Justine, 2019
- Procamallanus hilarii Vaz & Pereira, 1934
- Procamallanus huacraensis Ramallo, 2008
- Procamallanus incognitus Yooyen, Moravec & Wongsawad, 2011
- Procamallanus inopinatus Travassos, Artigas & Pereira, 1928
- Procamallanus istiblenni (Noble, 1966)
- Procamallanus jaliscensis
- Procamallanus jiriensis Sanachaoba & Gambhir, 2018
- Procamallanus johnsoni (Guerrero, 1971)
- Procamallanus juana Ailán-Choke, 2017
- Procamallanus kakinadensis Lakhsmi, 2000
- Procamallanus kalingapatnamensis Rajyalakshmi & Lakshmi, 1995
- Procamallanus karachiensis Rasheed, 1970
- Procamallanus laeviconchus (Wedl, 1861)
- Procamallanus lamellari (Gupta & Garg, 1986)
- Procamallanus longus Moravec, Justine & Rigby, 2006
- Procamallanus lonis Yamaguti, 1941
- Procamallanus lutjanusi Lakshmi, 2000
- Procamallanus macaensis Vicente & Santos, 1972
- Procamallanus mehrii Agarwal, 1930
- Procamallanus mexicanus
- Procamallanus monotaxis (Olsen, 1952)
- Procamallanus neobuccalaris Bilqees, Fatima & Rehana, 1977
- Procamallanus neocaballeroi Caballero
- Procamallanus olseni (Campana-Rouget & Razarihelissoa, 1965)
- Procamallanus otolithi Bilqees & Kazmi, 1974
- Procamallanus pacificus Moravec, Justine, Würtz & Sasal, 2006
- Procamallanus pakistanensis Yooyen, Moravec & Wongsawad, 2011
- Procamallanus papillicaudatus (Bashirullah & Williams, 1980)
- Procamallanus paraguayensis Petter, 1990
- Procamallanus partitus (Bashirullah & Williams, 1980)
- Procamallanus pereirai Annereaux, 1946
- Procamallanus phillippinensis (Velasquez, 1980) Arthur & Lumanlan-Mayo, 1997
- Procamallanus pimelodus Pinto, Fábio, Noronha & Rolas, 1974
- Procamallanus pintoi Kohn & Fernandes, 1988
- Procamallanus planoratus Kulkarni, 1935
- Procamallanus platycephali (Hooper, 1983)
- Procamallanus plumierus (Bashirullah & Williams, 1980)
- Procamallanus problematicus Yooyen, Moravec & Wongsawad, 2011
- Procamallanus pseudospiralis Moravec & Scholz, 2017
- Procamallanus rebecae (Andrade-Salas, Pineda-López & Garcia-Magaña, 1994) Moravec, Mendoza-Franco, Vargas-Vásquez & Vivas-Rodíguez, 1995
- Procamallanus rigbyi Yooyen, Moravec & Wongsawad, 2011
- Procamallanus sigani Yamaguti, 1935
- Procamallanus similis Yooyen, Moravec & Wongsawad, 2011
- Procamallanus sinespinis Moravec & Justine, 2017
- Procamallanus slomei Southwell & Kirshner, 1937
- Procamallanus soodi (Gupta & Masoodi, 1988)
- Procamallanus sparus Akram, 1975
- Procamallanus sphaeroconchus Toernquist, 1931
- Procamallanus spiculastriatus Pinheiro, Melo, Monks, Santos & Giese, 2018
- Procamallanus spiculogubernaculus
- Procamallanus spinicaudatus (Bashirullah & Williams, 1980)
- Procamallanus spiralis Baylis, 1923
- Procamallanus synodi Moravec & Justine, 2019
- Procamallanus thalassomatis Moravec & Justine, 2019
- Procamallanus tomsici Ramallo & Ailán-Choke, 2020
- Procamallanus tornquisti Campana-Rouget, 1961
- Procamallanus variolae Moravec, Justine & Rigby, 2006
- Procamallanus visakhapatnamensis Rajyalakshmi, Rao & Shyamasundari, 1988
