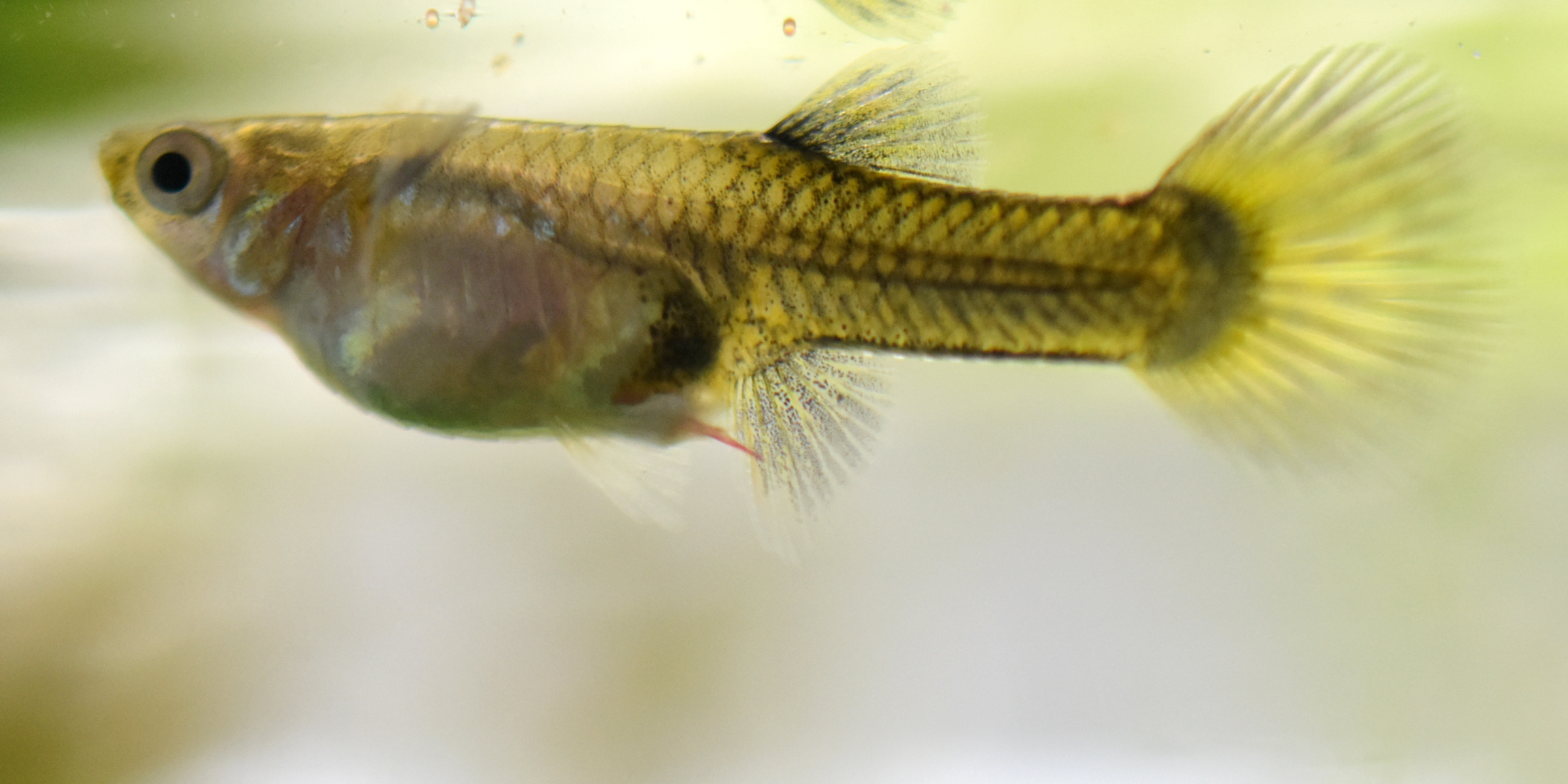
- Guppy female with Camallanus cotti

Scientific classification
- Kingdom: Animalia
- Phylum: Nematoda
- Class: Secernentea
- Order: Camallanida
- Family: Camallanidae
- Genus: Camallanus; Railliet and Henry, 1915

Species
- Camallanus cotti; Camallanus fotedari; Camallanus hypophthalmichthys; Camallanus lacustris; Camallanus nithoggi; Camallanus oxycephalus; Camallanus trispinosus; Camallanus tuckeri; Camallanus waelhreow

= Camallanus =

Genus of roundworms

Camallanus is a genus of parasitic roundworms in the family Camallanidae.

Camallanus cotti is a parasite of several freshwater fish species including Tachysurus fulvidraco, the yellowhead catfish or Korean bullhead, a species of bagrid catfish found in eastern Asia from Siberia to China, Korea, Vietnam and Laos. Species such as Camallanus fotedari are parasites of aquarium fish. Fenbendazole, a drug, has gained prominence among aquarists as an effective treatment for Camallanus roundworm infestations in freshwater tropical fish.

Camallanus trispinosus has been found in a captive Indian star tortoise (Geochelone elegans).
