= Micropleudidae =

Scientific classification
- Domain: Eukaryota
- Kingdom: Animalia
- Phylum: Nematoda
- Class: Secernentea
- Order: Camallanida
- Family: Micropleudidae

Family of roundworms

Micropleudidae is a family of nematodes belonging to the order Camallanida.

Genera:

- Micropleura
