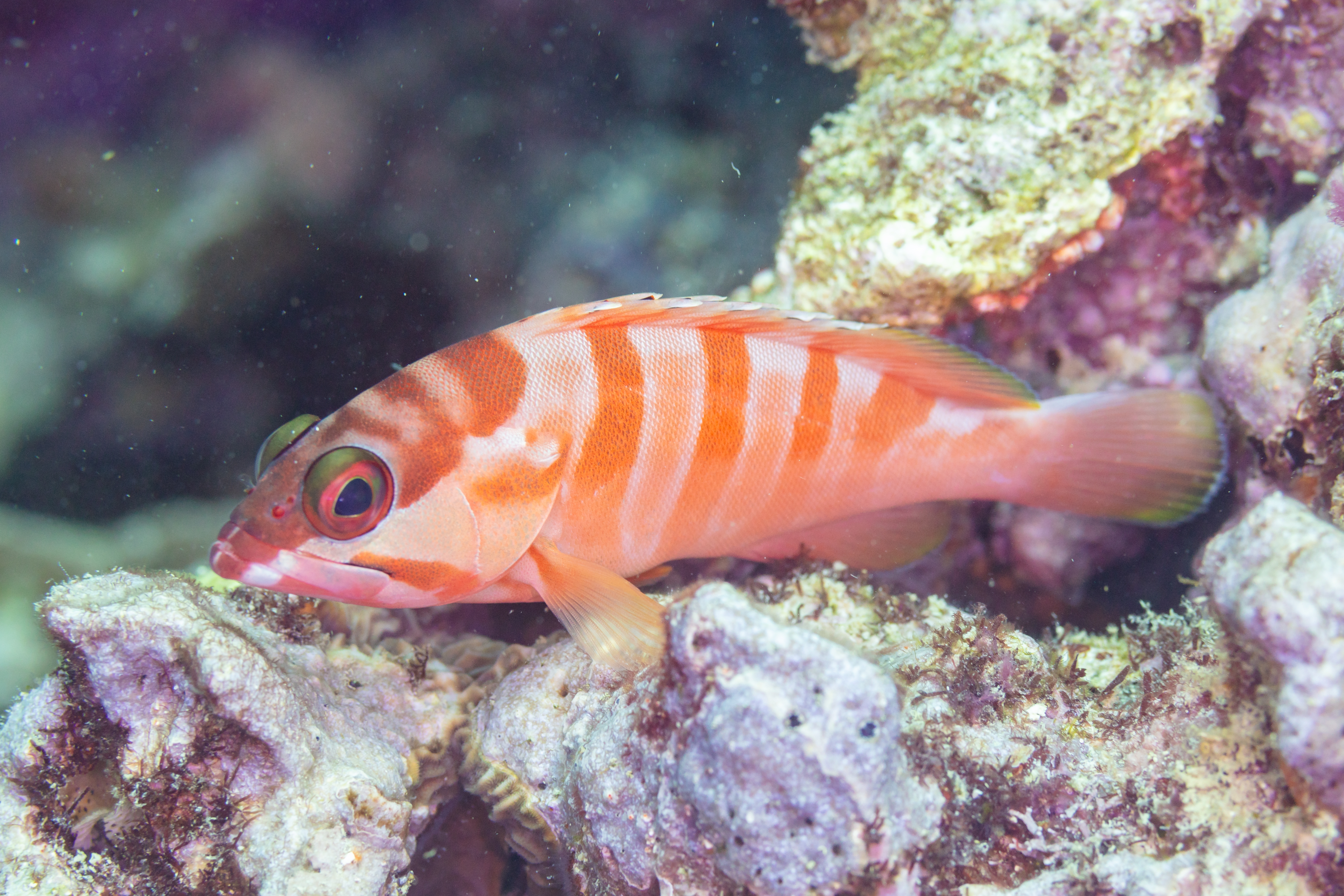
- Adult of Epinephelus fasciatus

Conservation status
- Least Concern (IUCN 3.1)

Scientific classification
- Kingdom: Animalia
- Phylum: Chordata
- Class: Actinopterygii
- Division: Teleostei
- Order: Perciformes
- Suborder: Percoidei
- Family: Epinephelidae
- Genus: Epinephelus
- Species: E. fasciatus

Binomial name
- Epinephelus fasciatus Forsskål, 1775

Synonyms
- List: Perca fasciata Forsskål, 1775; Serranus fasciatus (Forsskål, 1775); Epinephelus marginalis Bloch, 1793; Serranus marginalis (Bloch, 1793); Holocentrus erythraeus Bloch & Schneider, 1801; Holocentrus forskael Lacépède, 1802; Holocentrus marginatus Lacépède, 1802; Holocentrus rosmarus Lacépède, 1802; Holocentrus oceanicus Lacépède, 1802; Serranus oceanicus (Lacépède, 1802); Serranus alexandrinus Valenciennes, 1828; Cerna alexandrina (Valenciennes, 1828); Epinephelus alexandrinus (Valenciennes, 1828); Serranus variolosus Valenciennes, 1828; Epinephelus variolosus (Valenciennes, 1828); Serranus tsirimenara Temminck & Schlegel, 1842; Epinephelus tsirimenara (Temminck & Schlegel, 1842); Perca maculata Forster, 1844; Serranus cruentus De Vis, 1884; Serranus geometricus De Vis, 1884; Serranus subfasciatus De Vis, 1884; Epinephelus zapyrus Seale, 1906; Epinephelus emoryi Schultz, 1953

= Blacktip grouper =

Species of fish

The blacktip grouper (Epinephelus fasciatus), also known as the redbanded grouper, blacktipped cod, black-tipped rockcod, footballer cod, red-barred cod, red-barred rockcod, scarlet rock-cod or weathered rock-cod, is a species of marine ray-finned fish in the grouper family Epinephelidae. It is found in the tropical Indo-Pacific region.

== Taxonomy ==
The blacktip grouper was first formally described as Perca fasciata in 1775 by the Swedish-speaking Finnish-born explorer Peter Forsskål (1732-1763) with the type locality given as Ras Muhammad in the southern Sinai Peninsula of Egypt. The German naturalist Marcus Elieser Bloch (1723–1799) erected Epinephelus when he described E. marginalis in 1793, but E. marginalis was found to be a synonym of Perca fasciata, so this species is the type species of its genus.

== Distribution ==
The blacktip grouper has a wide Indo-Pacific distribution. Its range extends from the Red Sea and the Eastern Cape in South Africa to the Pitcairn Islands longitudinally, and from southern Japan and Korea to New Caledonia and Australia latitudinally. In particular, it is found around Madagascar, Mascarenes, Comoros and the Seychelles. In Australia, it occurs on the west coast, around the tropical coastline in the north, and as far south as Port Hacking in New South Wales. It can also be found on reefs in the Coral Sea, around Christmas Island and around Elizabeth Reef and Lord Howe Island in the Tasman Sea. A single record was reported in 2012 from the eastern Mediterranean Sea, off Lebanon.

== Habitat ==
The blacktip grouper is found associated with coral reefs, with a depth range of 4–160 m (13–525 ft) (though it is more commonly found at a depth of at least 15 m (49 ft)). It may inhabit both marine and brackish environments, with juveniles sometimes taking shelter in mangrove swamps. It is sometimes found in groups of 10-15 individuals.

== Description ==
=== Body form, size and meristics ===
The standard length of the blacktip grouper is around 2.8 to 3.3 times its depth. The area between the eyes is flat but the dorsal profile of the head is convex. The rounded preopercle has a finely serrated rear margin, with the lowest serrations slightly enlarged. The upper edge of the gill cover is straight. The dorsal fin contains 11 spines and 15-17 soft rays while the anal fin has 3 spines and 8 soft rays. The membranes between the dorsal-fin spines are deeply indented. The caudal fin is moderately rounded. There are 49-75 scales in the lateral line. This species attains a maximum total length of 40 cm (16 in), although a more common length is around 22 cm (8.7 in). The maximum published weight is 2.0 kg (4.4 lb).

=== Coloration ===
The adult coloration is variable and ranges from pale greenish-grey to pale reddish-yellow to scarlet. There are frequently 5 or 6 faint dark bars on the flanks, with the final one on the caudal peduncle. The scales on the upper body have a pale center and dark rear margin, which creates an indistinct checked pattern. The outer membrane of the spiny part of the dorsal fin is black (hence the common name), or dark red in specimens from Western Australia and from deep water. There is a pale yellow (or white) spot to the rear of the tip of each of the dorsal fin spines.

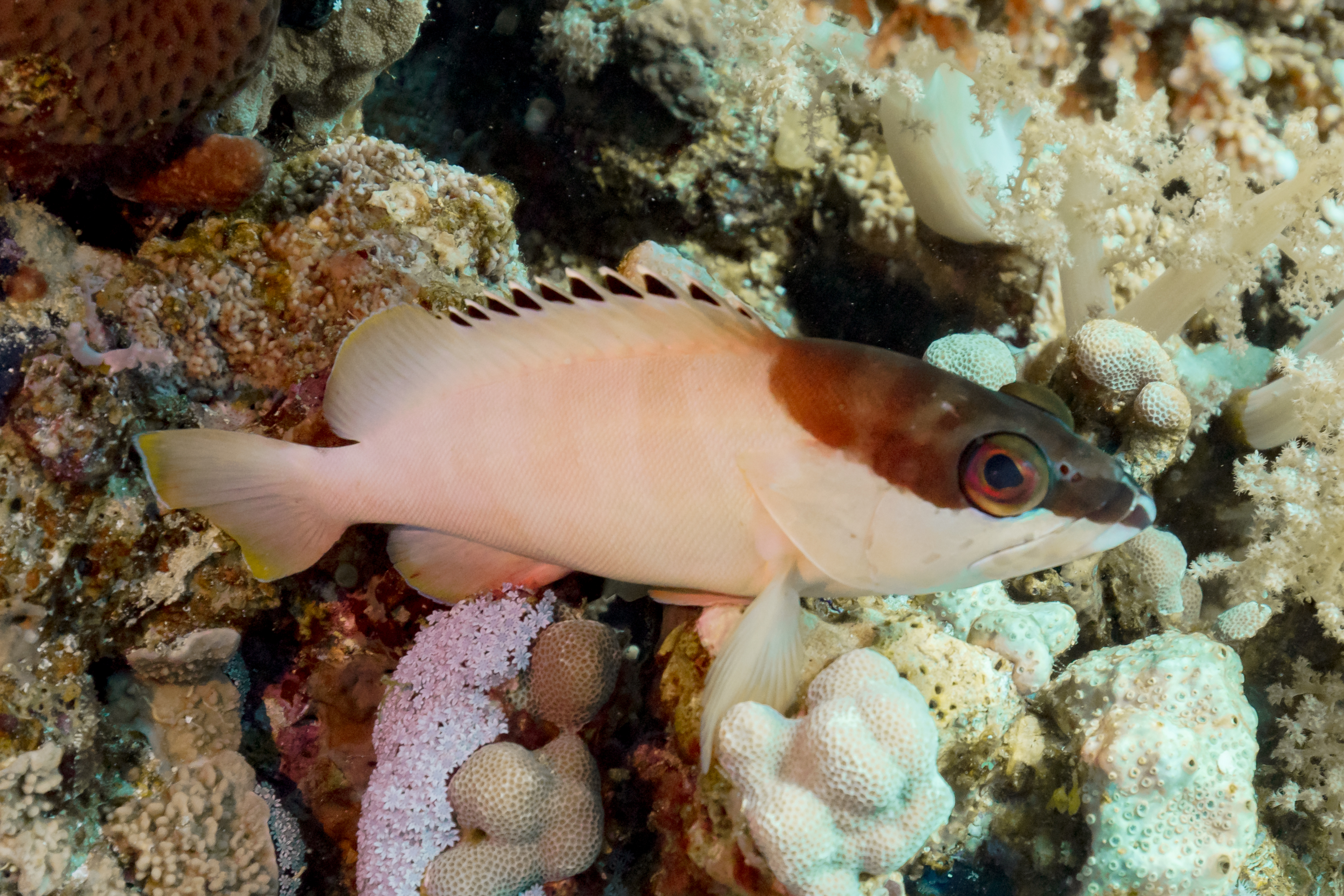
Juvenile

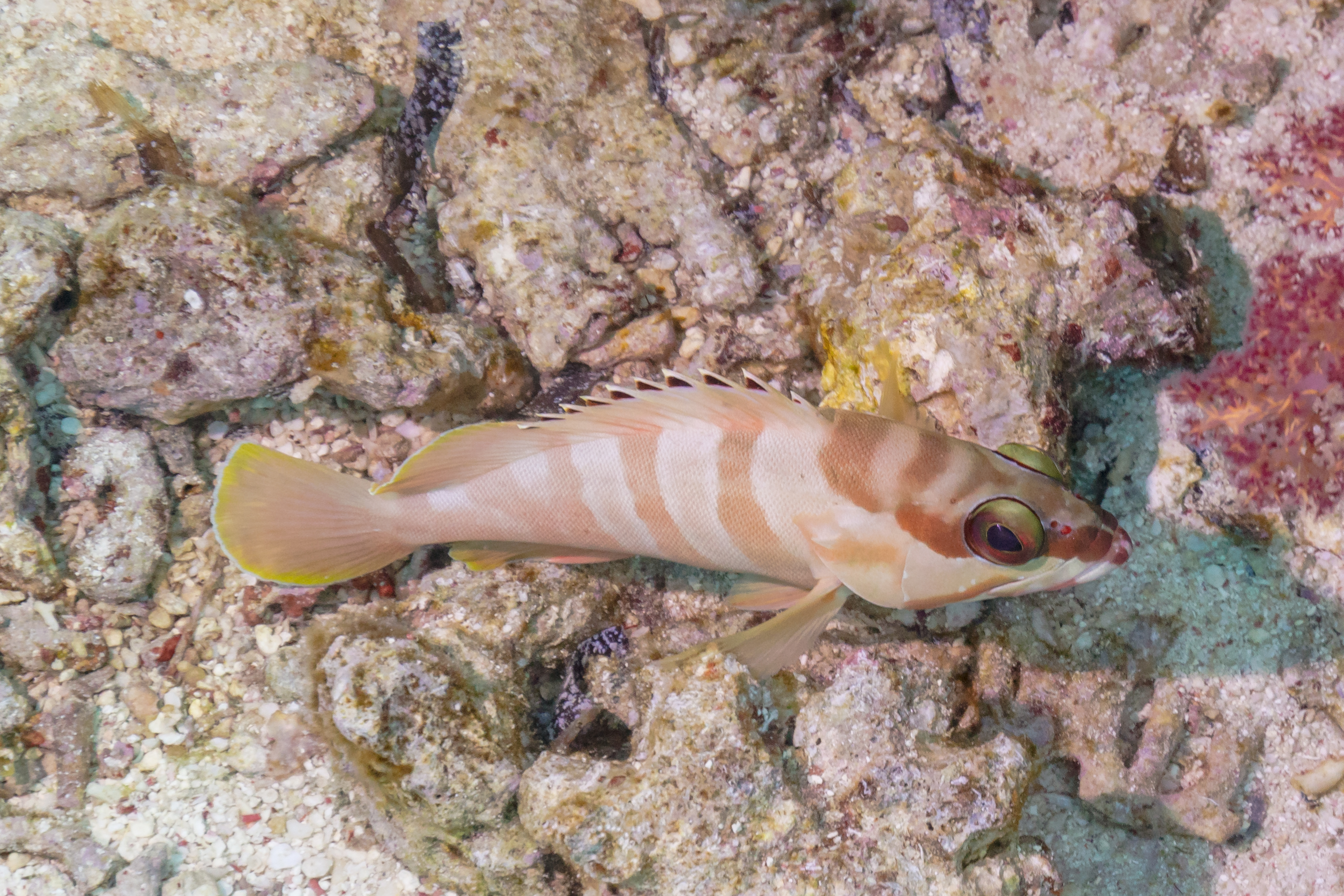
Adult

Swimming in captivity

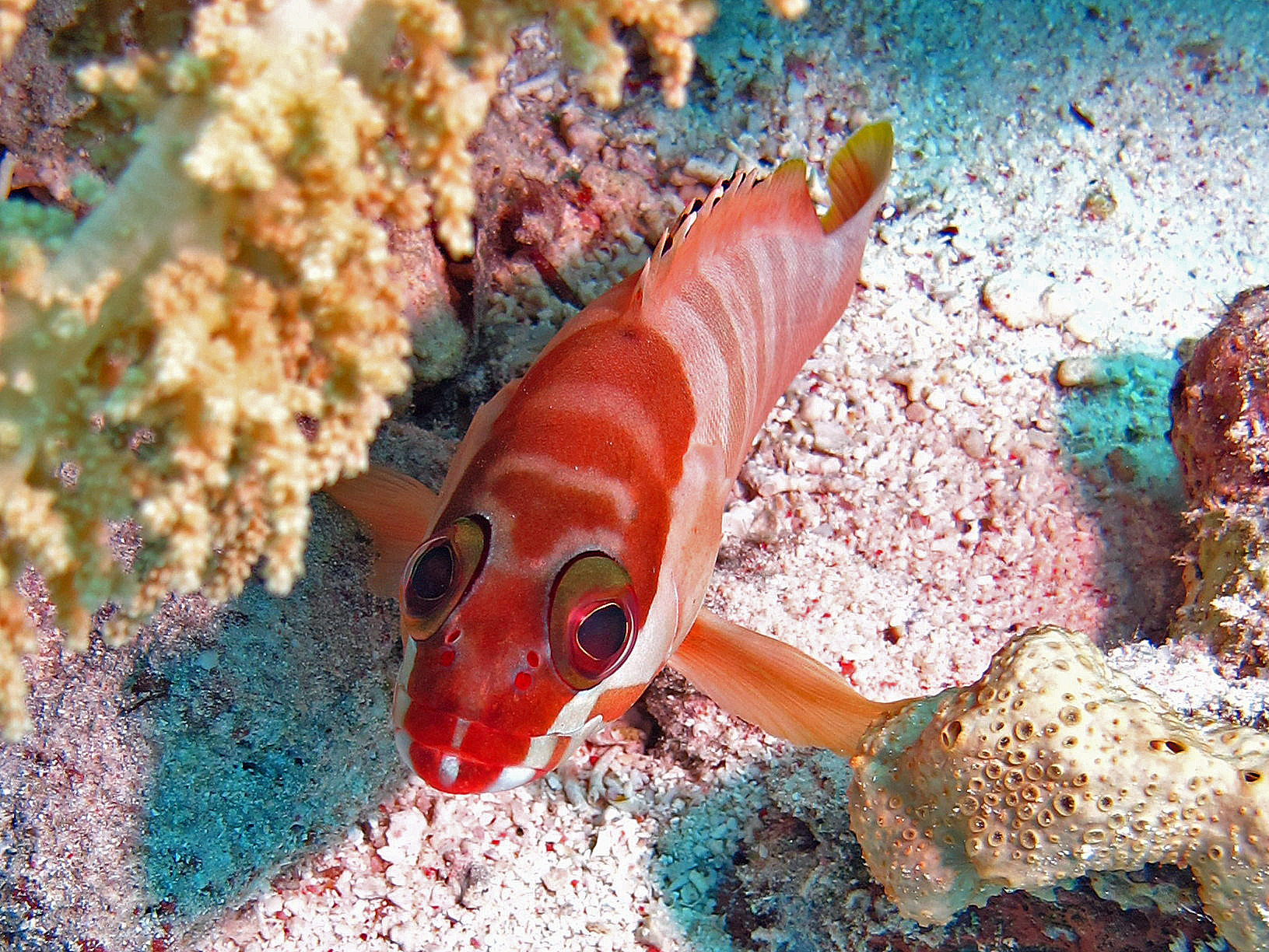
A variant of an adult with a pale body and a red front part

== Biology ==
=== Hermaphroditism ===
This species may present simultaneous hermaphroditism in smaller individuals, while the large individuals usually lose female function.

=== Diet ===
The blacktip grouper feeds on crustaceans and smaller fishes by ambushing them.

== Parasites ==
Blacktip groupers are host of several parasites, including:

- Several species in the flatworm genus Pseudorhabdosynochus, parasitic on the gills.
- The nematode Philometra fasciati. This species is parasitic in the ovary of female fish; the adult female parasite is a red worm which can reach up to 40 cm (16 in) in length, for a diameter of only 1.6 mm; the males are tiny.
- The nematode Raphidascaris (Ichthyascaris) fasciati. This species is paratisitc in the intestine, and may reach 20 mm (0.79 in) in length.
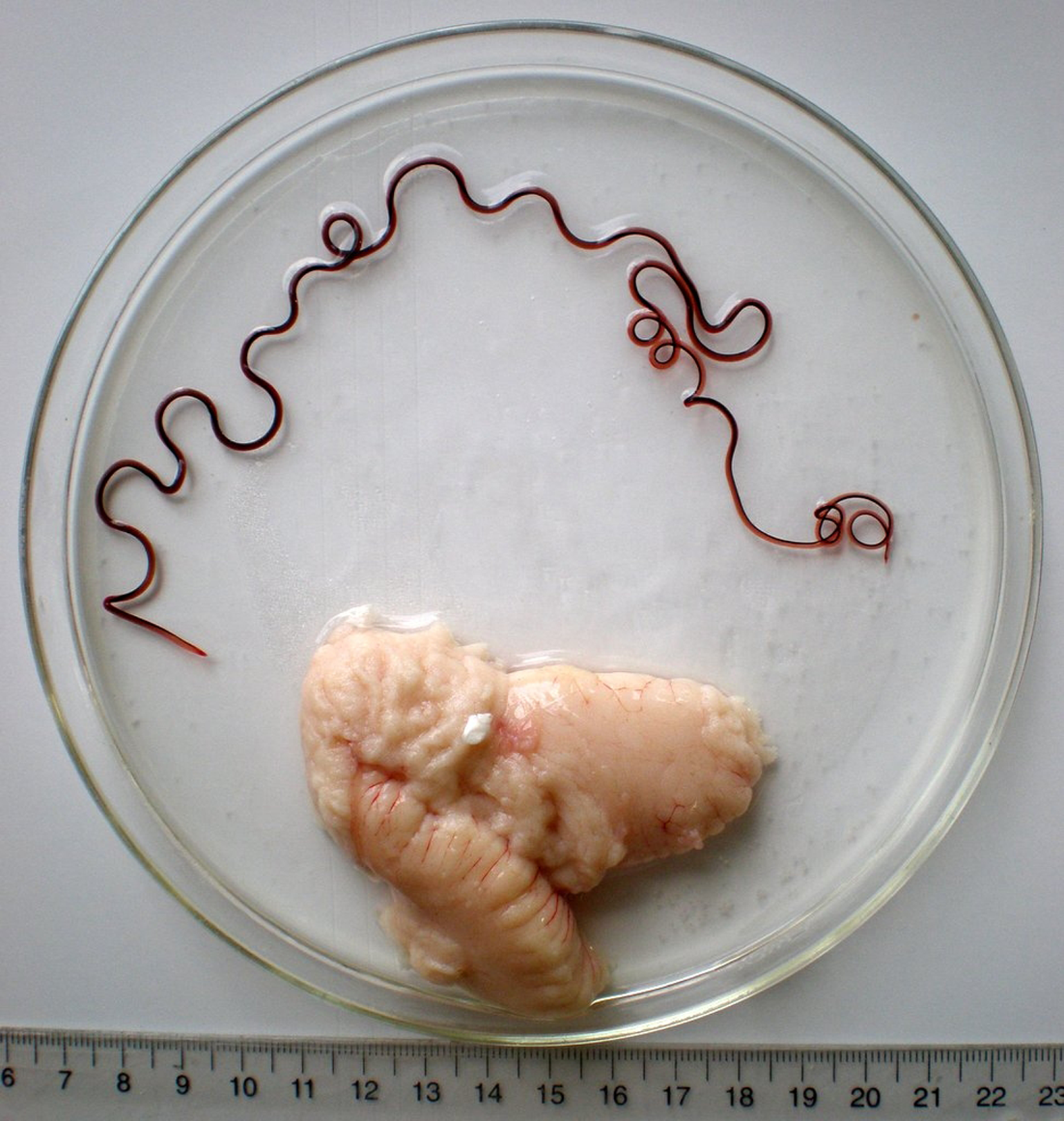
Philometra fasciati (Nematoda, Philometridae), a parasite of the ovary

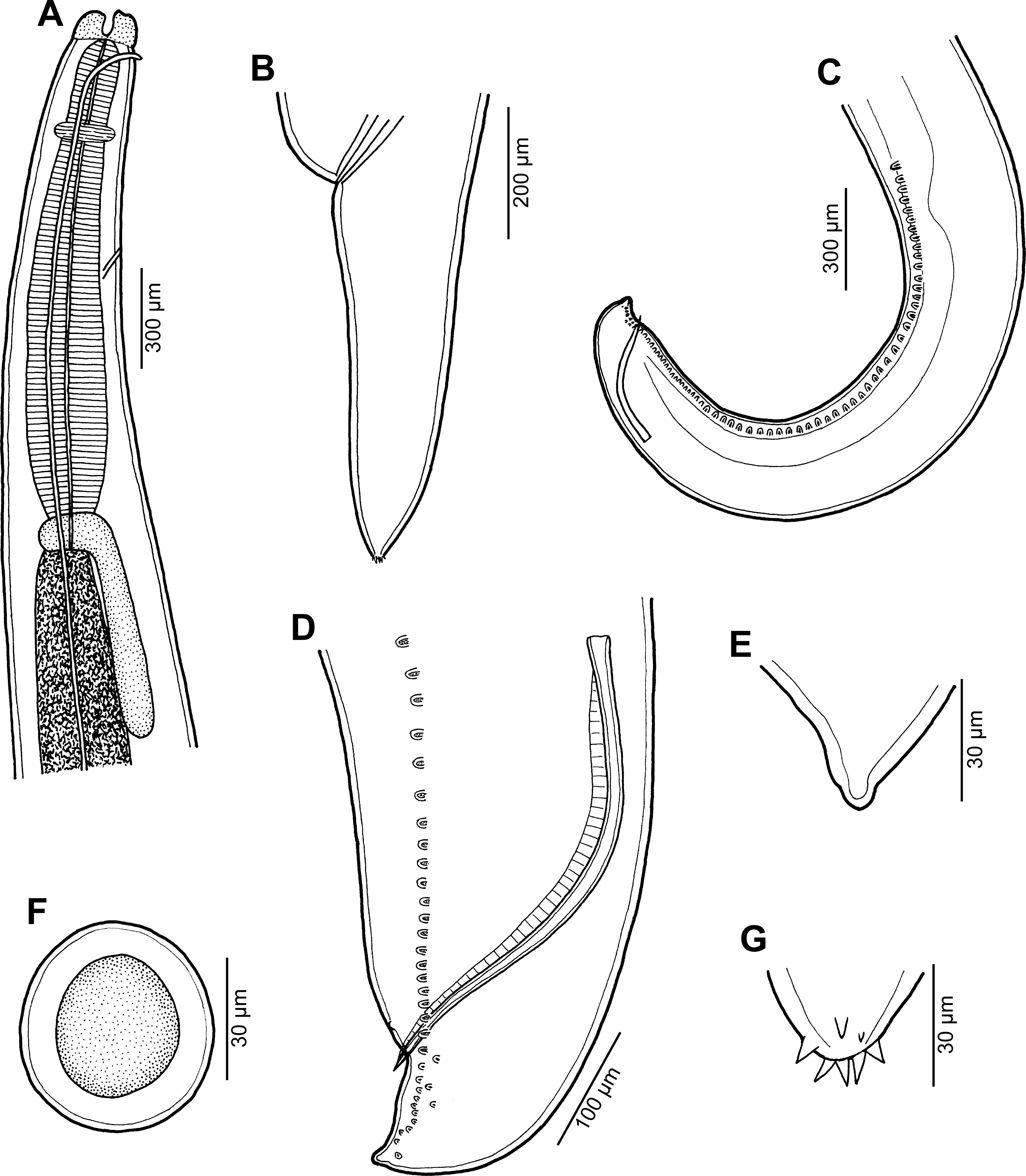
The nematode Ichthyascaris fasciati

== Human interactions ==
In the Red Sea, the blacktip grouper is fished by the Bedouin; it is also consumed in China. It has been associated with ciguatera poisoning.
