= Camallanidae =

Scientific classification
- Domain: Eukaryota
- Kingdom: Animalia
- Phylum: Nematoda
- Class: Secernentea
- Order: Camallanida
- Family: Camallanidae

Family of worms

Camallanidae is a family of nematodes belonging to the order Camallanida.

== Genera ==
Genera:

- Camallanides Baylis & Daubney, 1922
- Camallanus Railliet & Henry, 1915
- Malayocamallanus Jothy & Fernando, 1971
- Neocamallanus Chakravarty, Majumdar & Sain, 1961
- Neocylicostrongylus Arya & Johnson, 1977
- Neoparacamallanus Bilqees & Akram, 1982
- Onchophora Diesling, 1851
- Oncophora Diesing, 1851
- Paracamallanus Yorke & Maplestone, 1926
- Platocamallanus Bilqees & Akram, 1982
- Procamallanides Khera, 1956
- Procamallanus Baylis, 1923
- Serpinema Yeh, 1960
- Spirocamallanus Olsen
- Spirocotyle Yasmin & Bilqees, 2007
- Thelazo Pearse, 1933
