= Philometridae =

Scientific classification
- Domain: Eukaryota
- Kingdom: Animalia
- Phylum: Nematoda
- Class: Secernentea
- Order: Camallanida
- Family: Philometridae

Family of roundworms

Philometridae is a family of nematodes belonging to the order Rhabditida. All Philometridae are obligate tissue parasites of fish.

== Life cycle ==
Philometridae cycle between two hosts: Cyclopoida (small crustaceans) as an intermediate host, and various fish as a definitive host. First-stage larvae are ejected into the water, and develop to the third stage if they're eaten by a cyclopoid. Once the copepod is eaten by a fish, the larvae develop into adults and mate. Pregnant females migrate to a final site just under the fish's skin, in the swim bladder, or in the coelom; males die soon after mating and in many Philometridae species they have never been described.

== Genera ==
- Afrophilometra Moravec, Charo-Karisa & Jirků, 2009
- Alinema Rasheed, 1963
- Barracudia Moravec & Shamsi, 2017
- Buckleyella Rasheed, 1963
- Caranginema Moravec, Montoya-Mendoza & Salgado-Maldonado, 2008
- Clavinema Yamaguti, 1935
- Clavinemoides Moravec, Khosheghbal & Pazooki, 2013
- Congerinema Moravec, Nagasawa, Nitta & Tawa, 2019
- Dentiphilometra Moravec & Wang, 2002
- Dentirumai Quiazon & Moravec, 2012
- Digitiphilometroides Moravec & Barton, 2018
- Margolisianum Blaylock & Overstreet, 1999
- Neophilometroides Moravec, Salgado-Maldonado & Aguilar-Aguila, 2002
- Nilonema Khalil, 1960
- Paraphilometroides Moravec & Shaharom-Harrison, 1989
- Philometra Costa, 1845
- Philometroides Yamaguti, 1935
- Phlyctainophora Steiner, 1921
- Piscinema
- Rumai Travassos, 1960
- Spirophilometra Parukhin, 1971
