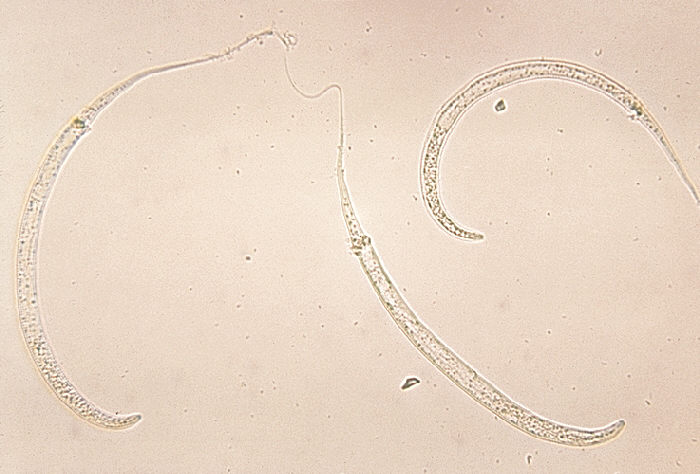
- Dracunculus medinensis

Scientific classification
- Domain: Eukaryota
- Kingdom: Animalia
- Phylum: Nematoda
- Class: Secernentea
- Subclass: Spiruria
- Order: Camallanida

Families
- Anguillicolidae; Camallanidae; Dracunculidae; Micropleudidae; Philometridae

Synonyms
- Camallanina

= Camallanida =

Order of roundworms

The Camallanida are an order of nematodes. They are parasites of terrestrial and aquatic vertebrates. They also use copepods as obligatory secondary hosts.

They are sometimes included in the Spirurida as a suborder Camallanina.

== Description ==
Amphid apertures of Camallaninas are pore or slit-like.

Camallaninas have posterior phasmids.

The excretory system of a Camallanina is tubular.

Cuticles of Camallaninas are striated in two to four layers. Lateral field is present.

Camallaninas have three esophageal glands. Their esophageal structure varies.

Sensory papillae of Camallaninas are cephalic.

== Notable species and genera ==
- Dracunculus medinensis (human as final host) and Anguillicola crassus (eels as final host) are important species.
- Philometra is a genus in the family Philometridae that parasitises fish.
