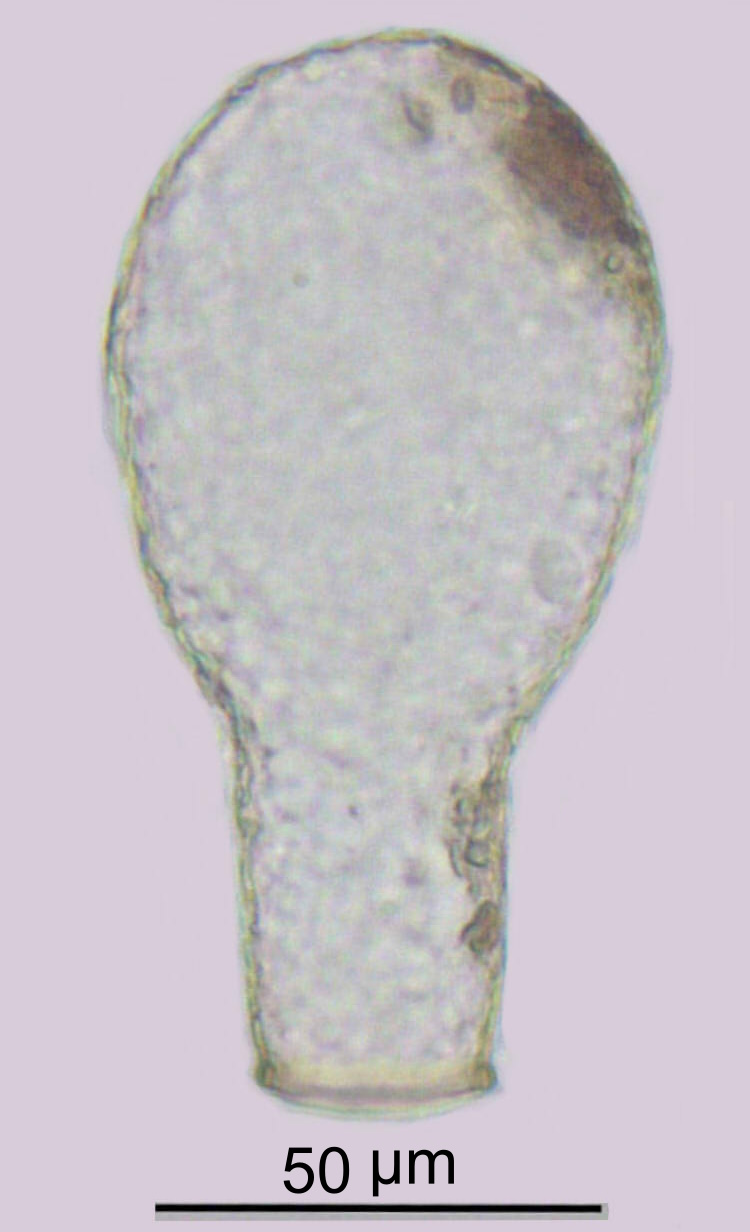
- Light micrograph of a P. lageniformis shell from São Miguel Island

Scientific classification
- Domain: Eukaryota
- Clade: Amorphea
- Phylum: Amoebozoa
- Class: Tubulinea
- Order: Arcellinida
- Family: Hyalospheniidae
- Genus: Padaungiella; Lara & Todorov, 2012

Type species
- Padaungiella lageniformis (Penard, 1890) Lara & Todorov, 2012

Species
- P. lageniformis; P. nebeloides; P. tubulata; P. wailesi; P. wetekampi

Synonyms
- Schaudinnia Jung, 1942

= Padaungiella =

Genus of amoebae

Padaungiella is a genus of testate amoebae belonging to the family Hyalospheniidae. It contains species previously found under the genus Nebela, distinguished by the long neck of their shells and the lack of a constriction on the base of the neck.

== Etymology ==
The name of this genus is derived from the name of a tibeto-Burmese ethnic minority, the Padaung, located in Burma. The women of this tribe traditionally wear long neck rings composed of a single brass coil placed around the neck. The length of the coil is gradually increased by pressuring the clavicle and the rib cage, giving the appearance of a very long neck; the theca of these amoebae are reminiscent of these long necks.

== Description ==
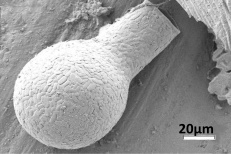
Scanning electron micrograph of P. lageniformis from São Miguel island

Padaungiella is closely related to genera Apodera and Alocodera, both by similar morphology of their shell and by evolutionary proximity. All three genera have a distinctly elongated neck, but Padaungiella in particular lacks a deep constriction between the shell body and the neck.

== Ecology ==
Species belonging to this genus are linked to minerotrophic habitats such as forest soils. They are distributed worldwide, as they have been reported in Sphagnum-dominated bogs of Russian Fennoscandia (specifically Republic of Karelia and Murmansk Oblast), Austria, Great Britain, the São Miguel Island in the Azores archipelago, Colombia, and even Antarctica, as well as closely located islands such as Guadeloupe, Martinique and the French Southern Territories.

== Systematics ==
The genus Padaungiella was described by protistologists Enrique Lara and Milcho Todorov in 2012, as part of a study that used DNA sequences to investigate the phylogenetic relationships of amoebae that were traditionally assigned to the genus Nebela. This genus was found to be paraphyletic, and three species (N. lageniformis, N. wailesi and N. nebeloides) clustered in the same monophyletic lineage, separated from the "core" Nebela species by other genera such as Quadrulella and Certesella.

These authors noticed that in 1942 Jung had described the genus Schaudinnia to accommodate some Nebela species with distinctively long necks and bottle-shaped shells: N. lageniformis, N. tubulata and N. wailesi. This genus was invalid, (Note: Due to article 13.3 of the International Code of Zoological Nomenclature, genera described after 1930 can only be validated if there is a type species designated to them.) and consequently these species remained in the genus Nebela. Because of the paraphyly of Nebela found by the 2012 study, the authors transferred N. lageniformis and the closely related species N. nebeloides and N. wailesi to the new genus Padaungiella, which was validated with P. lageniformis as the type species. Both N. tubulata and N. wetekampi, who were not genetically sequenced, were also transferred to this genus.

In her PhD thesis published in 2014, protistologist Anush Kosakyan included another six species: P. cordiformis, P. himalayana, P. longicollis, P. longitubulata, P. pulcherrima and P. varia, transferred from Nebela. However, she assigned them to the authors from the 2012 study, which did not mention any of these species. Additionally, P. longicollis would later be transferred to a new genus Alabasta in 2018. As a result, only five species are currently accepted within Padaungiella:

- Padaungiella lageniformis (Penard, 1890) Lara & Todorov, 2012
  = Nebela lageniformis Penard, 1890
- Padaungiella nebeloides (Gauthier-Lièvre & Thomas, 1958) Lara & Todorov, 2012
  = Difflugia lageniformis Gauthier-Lièvre & Thomas, 1958
  = Nebela nebeloides (Gauthier-Lièvre & Thomas, 1958) Todorov, Golemansky & Meisterfeld, 2010
- Padaungiella tubulata (Brown, 1911) Lara & Todorov, 2012
  = Nebela tubulata Brown, 1911
- Padaungiella wailesi (Deflandre, 1936) Lara & Todorov, 2012
  = Nebela wailesi Deflandre, 1936
- Padaungiella wetekampi (Jung, 1942) Lara & Todorov, 2012
  = Nebela wetekampi Jung, 1942
