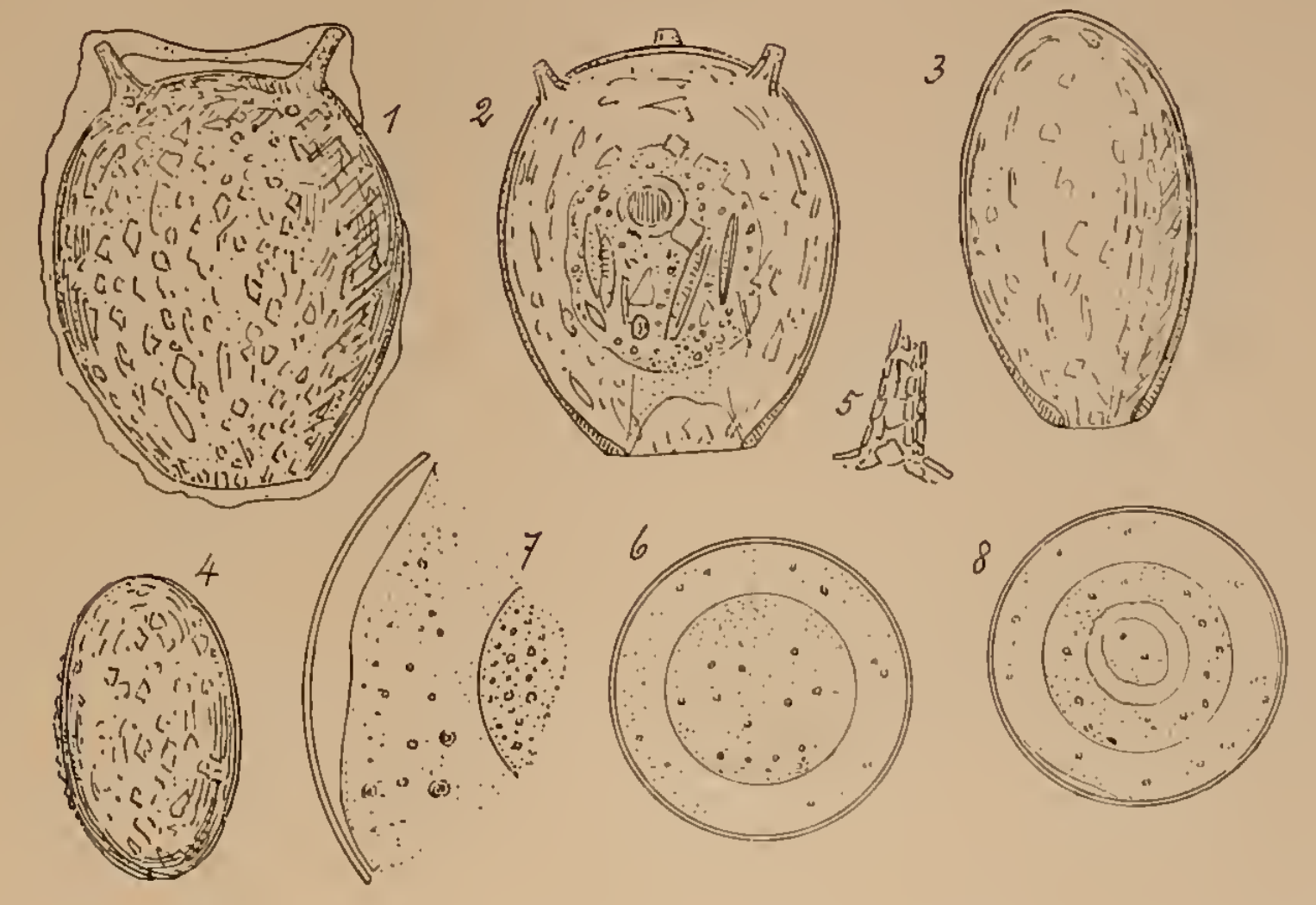
- First drawing of Erugomicula bidens as Difflugia bidens, by Eugène Penard in 1902.

Scientific classification
- Domain: Eukaryota
- Phylum: Amoebozoa
- Class: Tubulinea
- Order: Arcellinida
- Family: Incertae sedis
- Genus: Erugomicula; Nasser, Singer, Patterson & Roe 2021

Type species
- Difflugia bidens Penard, 1902

= Erugomicula =

Genus of testate amoebae

Erugomicula is a genus of testate lobose amoebae found in the order Arcellinida. It was described in 2021 and tentatively placed in the family Hyalospheniidae, but it is also attributable to the family Difflugiidae, based solely on morphological characteristics. At present it is placed as incertae sedis within the larger Arcellinida group.

== Species ==
The type species is Erugomicula bidens, previously known as Difflugia bidens. Additionally, based on the similar compressed test shape, the authors that described this genus tentatively place two other taxa of Difflugia inside Erugomicula: the species D. biconcava and the possible junior synonym of that species, D. balcanica. Further molecular studies are required to investigate the composition of the genus.
