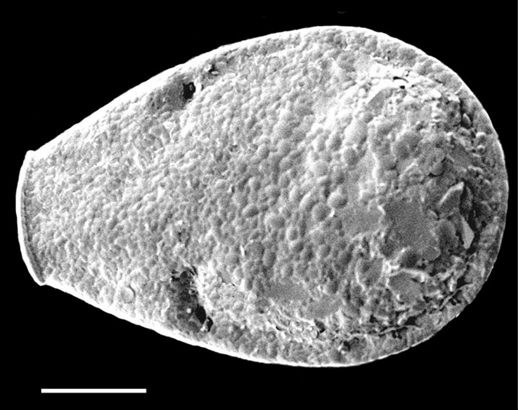
- P. paracarinata SEM image. Scale bar 50 μm

Scientific classification
- Domain: Eukaryota
- Clade: Amorphea
- Phylum: Amoebozoa
- Class: Tubulinea
- Order: Arcellinida
- Family: Hyalospheniidae
- Genus: Porosia; Jung 1942 sensu Bobrov & Kosakyan

Type species
- Porosia bigibbosa (Penard 1890) Jung 1942

Species
- P. bigibbosa; P. paracarinata

= Porosia =

Genus of testate amoebae

Porosia is a genus of arcellinid testate amoebae belonging to the family Hyalospheniidae. Described in 1942, it used to be a monotypic genus with the sole species P. bigibbosa. However a second species, P. paracarinata, was discovered in 2015.

== Morphology ==
The original 1942 description of Porosia corresponds to the type species P. bigibbosa. The description was expanded in 2015 to fit both species.

The organism consists of a pyriform, laterally compressed test with a rounded posterior end, two large invaginated pores situated on each lateral compression, both of which connected by internal tubes in Certesella. Small lateral pores are seen anterior to the large ones. Lateral keels, present in P. paracarinata but absent in P. bigibbosa, surround a third of the posterior lateral margins. The test itself is composed of euglyphid shell plates embedded in a disorganized cement. The test's aperture or "pseudostome" is surrounded with a lip made of organic compounds.

It is closely related to Certesella, but lacks a punctuated neck.

== Ecology ==
Porosia species are rare and have been seen inhabiting Sphagnum mosses, forest litter and soil.
