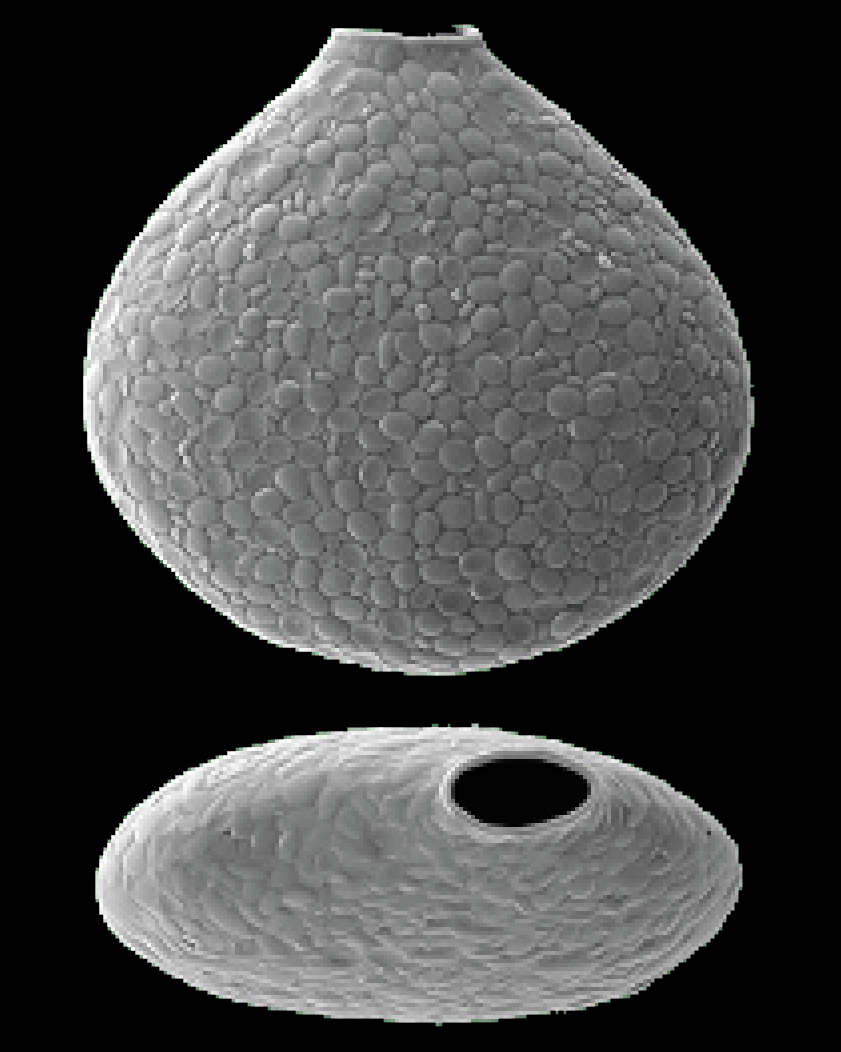
- Nebela flabellulum

Scientific classification
- Domain: Eukaryota
- Clade: Amorphea
- Phylum: Amoebozoa
- Class: Tubulinea
- Order: Arcellinida
- Family: Hyalospheniidae
- Genus: Nebela; Leidy 1874

Type species
- Nebela collaris (Ehrenberg 1848) Leidy 1879

Species
- 13 species

Synonyms
- Difflugia (Reticella) Ehrenberg 1872; Cyphoderiopsis Playfair 1918; Argynnia Jung 1942 nom. nud.; Leidyella Jung 1942 nom. nud.; Umbonaria Jung 1942 nom. nud.; Pterygia Jung 1942 nom. nud.; Schaudinnia Jung 1942 nom. nud.; Deflandria Jung 1942 nom. nud.

= Nebela =

Nebela Temporal range: Pleistocene–Recent 2.58–0 Ma

Genus of testate amoebae

Nebela is a diverse genus of testate amoebae of cosmopolitan distribution, belonging to the family Hyalospheniidae. They are "prey agglutinated" or "kleptosquamic" organisms, meaning they take the inorganic plates from their prey to construct their test.

== Morphology ==
Members of this genus have a thin, transparent, pseudochitinous, flattened test that can be ovate, pyriform or elongate, with a length of around 180 microns. The surface of the test has numerous oval or circular scales of variable size, or in rare occasions rectangular or rod-like scales. The protoplasm is granular and colorless but can contain food vacuoles that show color. They have a single nucleus and a variable number of pseudopodia that are blunt in shape. The cell body is attached to the test's interior by strands of ectoplasm.

== Classification ==
Nebela originally belonged to the family Nebelidae, but phylogenetic analyses showed that the genus was paraphyletic and the genera Hyalosphenia and Quadrulella, which belong to Hyalospheniidae, branch within Nebela. Accordingly, the family Nebelidae was synonymised with Hyalospheniidae.

=== Species ===
There are at least 13 remaining species in the genus:

- Nebela acolla Cash 1909
- Nebela aliciae Mitchell & Lara 2013
- Nebela barbata Leidy 1874
- Nebela carinatella Beyens & Chardez 1982
- Nebela collaris (Ehrenberg 1848) Leidy 1879 sensu Kosakyan & Gomaa 2013 (=Difflugia collaris Ehrenberg 1848; =D. cancellata Ehrenberg 1848; =D. reticulata Ehrenberg 1848; =D. carpio Ehrenberg 1854; =D. laxa Ehrenberg 1871; =D. cellulifera Ehrenberg 1874; =N. numata Leidy 1874; =N. bohemica Taranek 1882; =N. sphagnophila (Steinecke) Van Oye 1933; =N. tincta var. major Deflandre 1936; =N. tincta f. stenostoma Jung 1936)
- Nebela cylindrica Bonnet, 1979
- Nebela equicalceus Leidy 1874
- Nebela flabellulum Leidy 1874
- Nebela guttata Kosakyan & Lara 2013
- Nebela pechorensis Kosakyan & Lara 2013
- Nebela rotunda Penard 1890
- Nebela tenella Penard 1893
- Nebela tincta (Leidy 1879) Awerintzew 1906 sensu Kosakyan & Lara 2013 (=Hyalosphenia tincta Leidy 1879; =N. bursella Vejdovsky 1882; =N. parvula Cash & Hopkinson 1909; =N. minor Penard 1902)

=== Former species ===
The paraphyly of Nebela is slowly being resolved by transferring species from Nebela to other genera through phylogenetic analyses. The following species were previously considered Nebela but have been moved accordingly:

- Alabasta Duckert, Blandenier, Kosakyan & Singer 2018
  - Alabasta kivuense (Gauthier-Lievre & Thomas 1961) Duckert, Blandenier, Kosakyan & Singer 2018 (=N. kivuense Gauthier-Lievre & Thomas 1961)
  - Alabasta longicollis (Penard 1890) Duckert, Blandenier, Kosakyan & Singer 2018 (=N. longicollis Penard 1890)
  - Alabasta militaris (Penard 1890) Duckert, Blandenier, Kosakyan & Singer 2018 (=N. militaris Penard 1890; =N. bursella Taranek 1881; =N. americana var. bryophila Van Oye 1933)
- Cornutheca Kosakyan, Lahr, Mulot, Meisterfeld, Mitchell & Lara 2016
  - Cornutheca ansata (Leidy 1879) Kosakyan, Lahr, Mulot, Meisterfeld, Mitchell & Lara 2016 (=N. ansata Leidy 1879)
  - Cornutheca saccifera (Wailes 1913) Kosakyan, Lahr, Mulot, Meisterfeld, Mitchell & Lara 2016 (=N. saccifera Wailes 1913)
  - Cornutheca hippocrepis (=N. hippocrepis)
  - Cornutheca jiuhuensis (=N. jiuhuensis Qin, Mitchell & Lara 2016)
- Gibbocarina Kosakyan, Lahr, Mulot, Meisterfeld, Mitchell & Lara 2016
  - Gibbocarina galeata (Penard 1890) Kosakyan, Lahr, Mulot, Meisterfeld, Mitchell & Lara 2016 (=N. galeata Penard 1890)
  - Gibbocarina gracilis (Penard 1910) Kosakyan, Lahr, Mulot, Meisterfeld, Mitchell & Lara 2016 (=N. gracilis Penard 1890)
- Longinebela Kosakyan, Lahr, Mulot, Meisterfeld, Mitchell & Lara 2016
  - Longinebela golemanskyi (Todorov 2010) Kosakyan, Lahr, Mulot, Meisterfeld, Mitchell & Lara 2016 (=N. golemanskyi Todorov 2010)
  - Longinebela meisterfeldi (Heger & Mitchell 2012) Kosakyan, Lahr, Mulot, Meisterfeld, Mitchell & Lara 2016 (=N. meisterfeldi Heger & Mitchell 2012)
  - Longinebela penardiana (Deflandre 1936) Kosakyan, Lahr, Mulot, Meisterfeld, Mitchell & Lara 2016 (=N. penardiana Deflandre 1936)
  - Longinebela speciosa (Deflandre 1936) Kosakyan, Lahr, Mulot, Meisterfeld, Mitchell & Lara 2016 (=N. speciosa Deflandre 1936)
  - Longinebela tubulosa (Penard 1902) Kosakyan, Lahr, Mulot, Meisterfeld, Mitchell & Lara 2016 (=N. tubulosa Penard 1902)
- Netzelia Ogden 1979
  - Netzelia tuberculata (Wallich 1864) Netzel 1983 (=N. tuberculata (Wallich 1864) Owen III & Jones 1976)
- Padaungiella Lara & Todorov 2012
  - Padaungiella lageniformis (Penard 1890) Lara & Todorov 2012 (=N. lageniformis Penard 1890)
  - Padaungiella wailesi (Deflandre 1936) Lara & Todorov 2012 (=N. wailesi Deflandre 1936)
  - Padaungiella wetekampi (Jung 1942) Lara & Todorov 2012 (=N. wetekampi Jung 1942)
  - Padaungiella tubulata (Brown 1911) Lara & Todorov 2012 (=N. tubulata Brown 1911)
  - Padaungiella nebeloides (Gauthier-Lièvre & Thomas 1958) Lara & Todorov 2012 (=N. nebeloides (Gauthier-Lièvre & Thomas 1958) Todorov, Golemansky & Meisterfeld 2010)
- Planocarina Kosakyan, Lahr, Mulot, Meisterfeld, Mitchell & Lara 2016
  - Planocarina carinata (Archer 1867) Kosakyan, Lahr, Mulot, Meisterfeld, Mitchell & Lara 2016 (=N. carinata (Archer 1867) Leidy 1879)
  - Planocarina marginata (Penard 1902) Kosakyan, Lahr, Mulot, Meisterfeld, Mitchell & Lara 2016 (=N. marginata Penard 1902)
  - Planocarina maxima (Awerintzew 1907) Kosakyan, Lahr, Mulot, Meisterfeld, Mitchell & Lara 2016 (=N. maxima Awerintzew 1907)
  - Planocarina spumosa (Awerintzew 1907) Kosakyan, Lahr, Mulot, Meisterfeld, Mitchell & Lara 2016 (=N. spumosa Awerintzew 1907)
- Physochila Jung 1942
  - Physochila griseola (Wailes & Penard 1911) (=N. griseola Wailes & Penard 1911)
