= Prantlitina =

Prantlitina Temporal range: Namurian–Present, 326–0 Ma

Scientific classification
- Domain: Eukaryota
- Clade: Amorphea
- Phylum: Amoebozoa
- Class: Tubulinea
- Order: Arcellinida
- Family: Difflugiidae
- Genus: Prantlitina; Vašíček & Růžička 1957

Species
- P. prantli; P. šustai; P. remeši; P. štúri

Genus of shelled amoebae

Prantlitina is a poorly studied genus of testate amoebae discovered in 1957 in Namurian freshwater sediments from the Ostrava-Karviná coal district, in former Czechoslovakia. It was placed in the order Thecamoebina in the defunct class Sarcodina. Later, in 1993, it was recognized as the earliest fossil member of the family Difflugiidae, order Arcellinida, but after that year it does not appear in any classification of Arcellinida or any other group.

== Etymology ==
The name Prantlitina was chosen in honor of the Czechoslovak palaeontologist Dr. Ferdinand Prantl.

== Taxonomy ==
According to the original description, Prantlitina contains two subgenera and 6 species, of which only 4 are described and named; the remaining two were left undescribed until a future moment where the study material would be better.

- Subgenus Prantlitina Vašíček & Růžička 1957
  - P. (Prantlitina) prantli Vašíček & Růžička 1957
  - P. (Prantlitina) šustai Vašíček & Růžička 1957
  - P. (Prantlitina) remeši Vašíček & Růžička 1957
- Subgenus Prantlitinopsis Vašíček & Růžička 1957
  - P. (Prantlitinopsis) štúri Vašíček & Růžička 1957
  - P. (Prantlitinopsis) sp. (two undescribed species)
