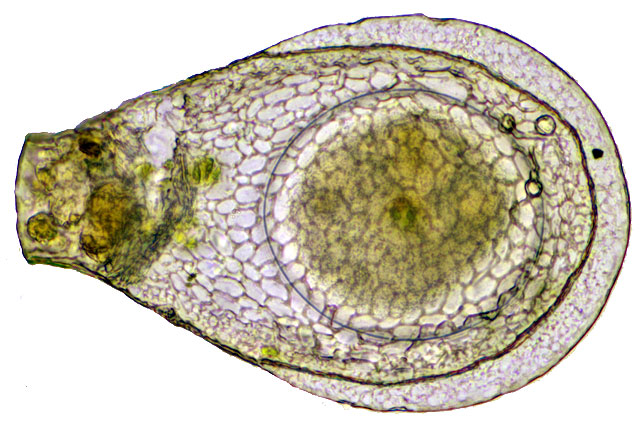
- P. carinata

Scientific classification
- Domain: Eukaryota
- Clade: Amorphea
- Phylum: Amoebozoa
- Class: Tubulinea
- Order: Arcellinida
- Family: Hyalospheniidae
- Genus: Planocarina; Kosakyan, Lahr, Mulot, Meisterfeld, Mitchell & Lara 2016

Type species
- Planocarina carinata (Archer 1867) Kosakyan, Lahr, Mulot, Meisterfeld, Mitchell & Lara 2016

Species
- P. carinata; P. marginata; P. maxima; P. spumosa

= Planocarina =

Genus of testate amoebae

Planocarina (from Latin planus 'flat' and carina 'keel') is a genus of arcellinid testate amoebae belonging to the family Hyalospheniidae. It was created in 2016 to agglutinate a clade of species that were previously assigned to the paraphyletic genus Nebela. All species of Planocarina have a compressed keel surrounding the posterior part of their shell. It is the sister group of Alabasta.

== Morphology ==
Members of Planocarina have an elongated, pyriform test with a distinct neck, and lateral margins tapering towards the test opening. The posterior part of the test is surrounded entirely by a flat keel. The test hyaline or slightly yellowish in color, composed of circular and elongated scales recycled from the organism's prey, such as euglyphid testate amoeba.

== Classification ==
Planocarina contains all former species of Nebela that have a flat keel, with the exception of those that have a lateral horn, which are assigned to Cornutheca. There are 4 species in total:

- Planocarina carinata (Archer 1867) Kosakyan, Lahr, Mulot, Meisterfeld, Mitchell & Lara 2016 (=Nebela carinata (Archer 1867) Leidy 1879)
- Planocarina marginata (Penard 1902) Kosakyan, Lahr, Mulot, Meisterfeld, Mitchell & Lara 2016 (=Nebela marginata Penard 1902)
- Planocarina maxima (Awerintzew 1907) Kosakyan, Lahr, Mulot, Meisterfeld, Mitchell & Lara 2016 (=Nebela maxima Awerintzew 1907)
- Planocarina spumosa (Awerintzew 1907) Kosakyan, Lahr, Mulot, Meisterfeld, Mitchell & Lara 2016 (=Nebela spumosa Awerintzew 1907)
