= Pseudocucurbitella =

Scientific classification
- Domain: Eukaryota
- Clade: Amorphea
- Phylum: Amoebozoa
- Class: Tubulinea
- Order: Arcellinida
- Genus: Pseudocucurbitella; Bovee 1972

Type species
- Pseudocucurbitella papillomata (Gauthier-Lièvre & Thomas) Bovee 1972

Synonyms
- Difflugia (Pseudocucurbitella) Gauthier-Lièvre & Thomas 1960

Genus of testate amoebae

Pseudocucurbitella is a genus of freshwater testate amoebae of the order Arcellinida. Its shell is agglutinated, ovoid, with a round crossection and a circular aperture surrounded by 3 to 5 separate lobes forming a short collar.

Originally, it was described as a subgenus of Difflugia in 1960, but was elevated to genus level in 1972. The taxonomic position of Pseudocucurbitella among Arcellinida is uncertain and the genus has been abandoned by recent classifications, but it was initially assigned to the family Difflugiidae.
