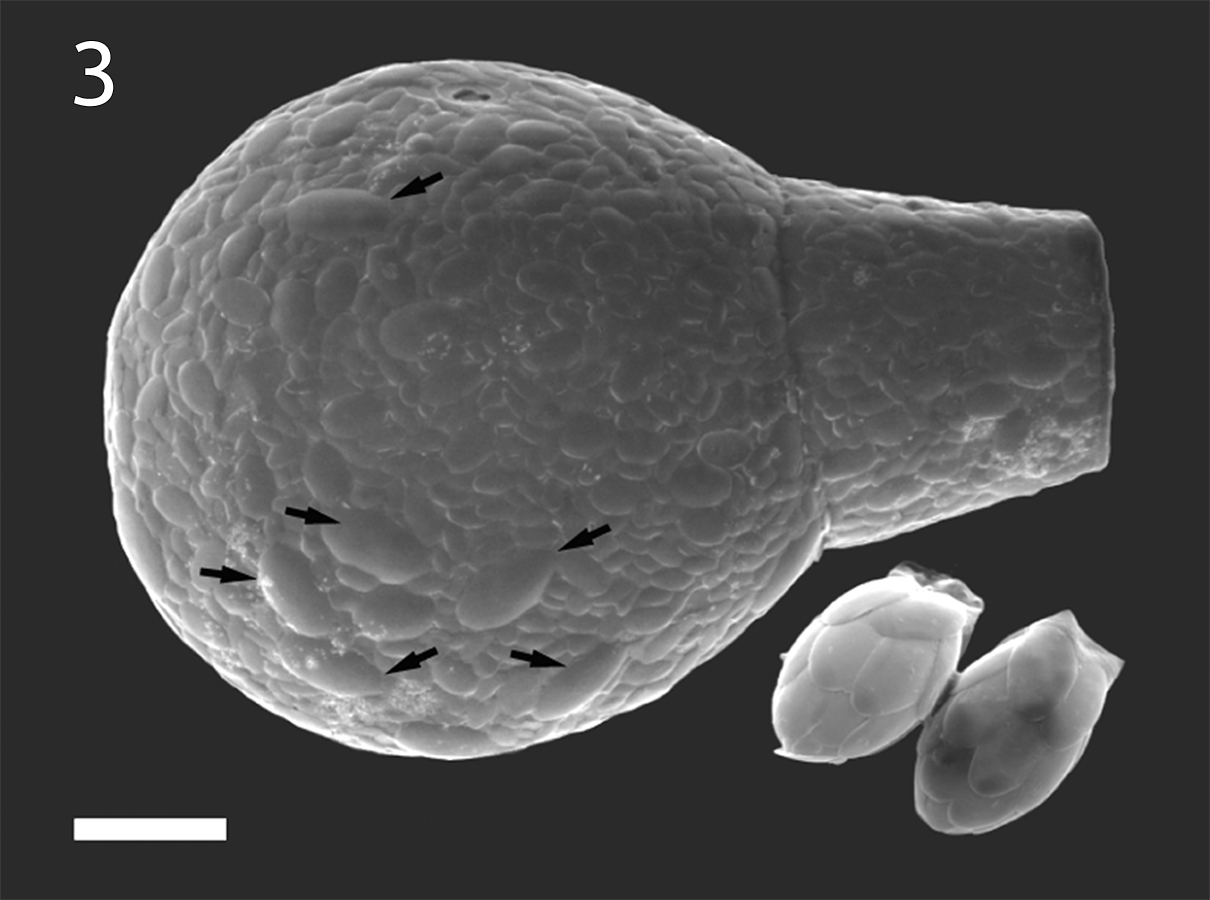
- Apodera vas

Scientific classification
- Domain: Eukaryota
- Phylum: Amoebozoa
- Class: Tubulinea
- Order: Arcellinida
- Family: Hyalospheniidae
- Genus: Apodera; Loeblich & Tappan, 1961

Type species
- Apodera vas (Certes 1889) Loeblich & Tappan 1961

Species
- A. angatakere; A. crenata; A. vas; A. wellingtonia

= Apodera =

Genus of shelled amoebae

Apodera is a genus of amoeboid protists belonging to the family Hyalospheniidae, a group of shelled amoebae. Their shells, or tests, are lageniform with a clear constriction that separates the neck from the body.

== Characteristics ==
Apodera are testate amoebae, protists with a cell body that generates pseudopodia and is enclosed within a test or shell. Their shells are composed of mineral material that is xenosomic, i.e. obtained from their prey, which are euglyphid amoebae. This is a common trait among the Hyalospheniidae, to which Apodera belongs. In particular, Apodera shells are uniquely distinctive by the presence of a clear, deep constriction that separates the neck from the body.

== Systematics ==
Apodera is a genus first proposed by Jung in 1942 without designating a type. Later, in 1961, the genus was validated by micropaleontologists Loeblich and Tappan. It is closely related to the genera Alocodera and Padaungiella by the similar shape of its shell, although Apodera is distinguished by the clear separation between the body and the neck of the shell due to a deep constriction. Phylogenetic analyses also support a close relationship with Alocodera and Padaungiella, where Apodera is the sister group to a clade containing these two genera. There are four species of Apodera:

- Apodera angatakere (Brehm 1928) Mitchell, Blandenier & Duckert 2021
  = Nebela penardi Brehm 1928
  Found in peatlands of New Zealand, the shell has a distinctive hollow keel.
- Apodera crenata Jung 1942
  Problematic species with no bibliographic record after its first publication, although morphologically well defined and different from the type species by its curved shell and small size. Found only in Chile on Sphagnum mosses.
- Apodera vas (Certes 1889) Loeblich & Tappan 1961
  = Nebela vas Certes 1889
  = Nebela goudinii Gericke 1932
  = Apodera vas Jung 1942 nomen nudum
  The type species, found in mosses such as Sphagnum, litter and organic soil. Its distribution is much wider than other species, with records from North America, South America, Oceania, Africa and Indonesia. A different form Apodera vas f. reticollaris was described by Jung in 1942, but it has not been proven with molecular methods.
- Apodera wellingtonia Decloitre 1964
  Rare and problematic species, found only once in two habitats. It was found in puddles of melting snow, and near rotten wood in wet lichens, in the island of Tasmania.
