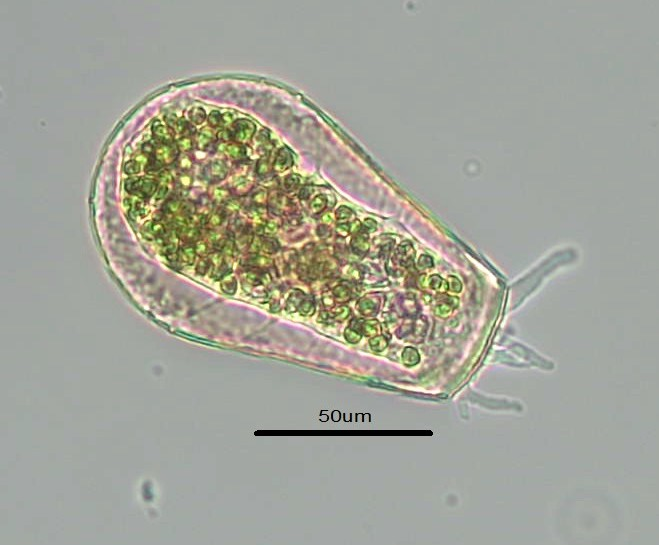
- Hyalosphenia papilio

Scientific classification
- Domain: Eukaryota
- Phylum: Amoebozoa
- Class: Tubulinea
- Order: Arcellinida
- Suborder: Glutinoconcha
- Infraorder: Hyalospheniformes; Lahr et al. 2019
- Family: Hyalospheniidae; Schulze, 1877 emend. Kosakyan & Lara, 2012

Type genus
- Hyalosphenia Stein 1857

Genera
- Alabasta; Alocodera; Apodera; Certesella; Cornutheca; Gibbocarina; Hyalosphenia; Longinebela; Mrabella; Nebela; Padaungiella; Planocarina; Porosia; Quadrulella

Diversity
- 87 species

Synonyms
- Nebelidae; Taranek 1882

= Hyalospheniidae =

Hyalospheniidae Temporal range: Middle Devonian 370–0 Ma

Family of testate amoebae

Hyalospheniidae is a family of arcellinid testate amoebae and the sole family of the infraorder Hyalospheniformes. Commonly referred to as "hyalospheniids", these lobose amoebae are characterized by their ability to generate a shell composed of either organic matter or siliceous particles that may be recycled from euglyphid amoebae. They inhabit soil or freshwater habitats, and are abundant on Sphagnum mosses.

Hyalospheniid amoebae originated after the middle Devonian, around 370 million years ago. They are considered important bioindicators, and are frequently used for environmental monitoring. Their fossils are studied to investigate the paleoecology of peatlands and lakes. The classification of hyalospheniids has changed several times since the 19th century based on morphological criteria. Initially classified as two separate families, Hyalospheniidae and Nebelidae, the Hyalospheniidae were shown to branch within the Nebelidae based on phylogenetic analyses, implying that both families should be merged with the Hyalospheniidae taking precedence according to the principle of proority of the zoological nomencladure code.

== Morphology ==
Hyalospheniidae are testate amoebae—unicellular amoeboid protists that generate mineral agglutinated shells. They are characterized by ovoid, pyriform, vase or flask-shaped shells, which are laterally compressed. Shell construction and composition varies substantially within the family. It can be either entirely secreted by their own cells and composed of an organic matrix (e.g. Hyalosphenia), or have additional non-organic siliceous scales. These mineral scales can also be self-secreted (e.g. Quadrulella), or can be recycled from the shell plates of small euglyphid amoebae or other similar material such as diatom frustules (e.g. Apodera, Padaungiella, Nebela). The trait of recycling shell plates from euglyphids is known as "kleptosquamy", and appears to be an ancestral trait within the family.

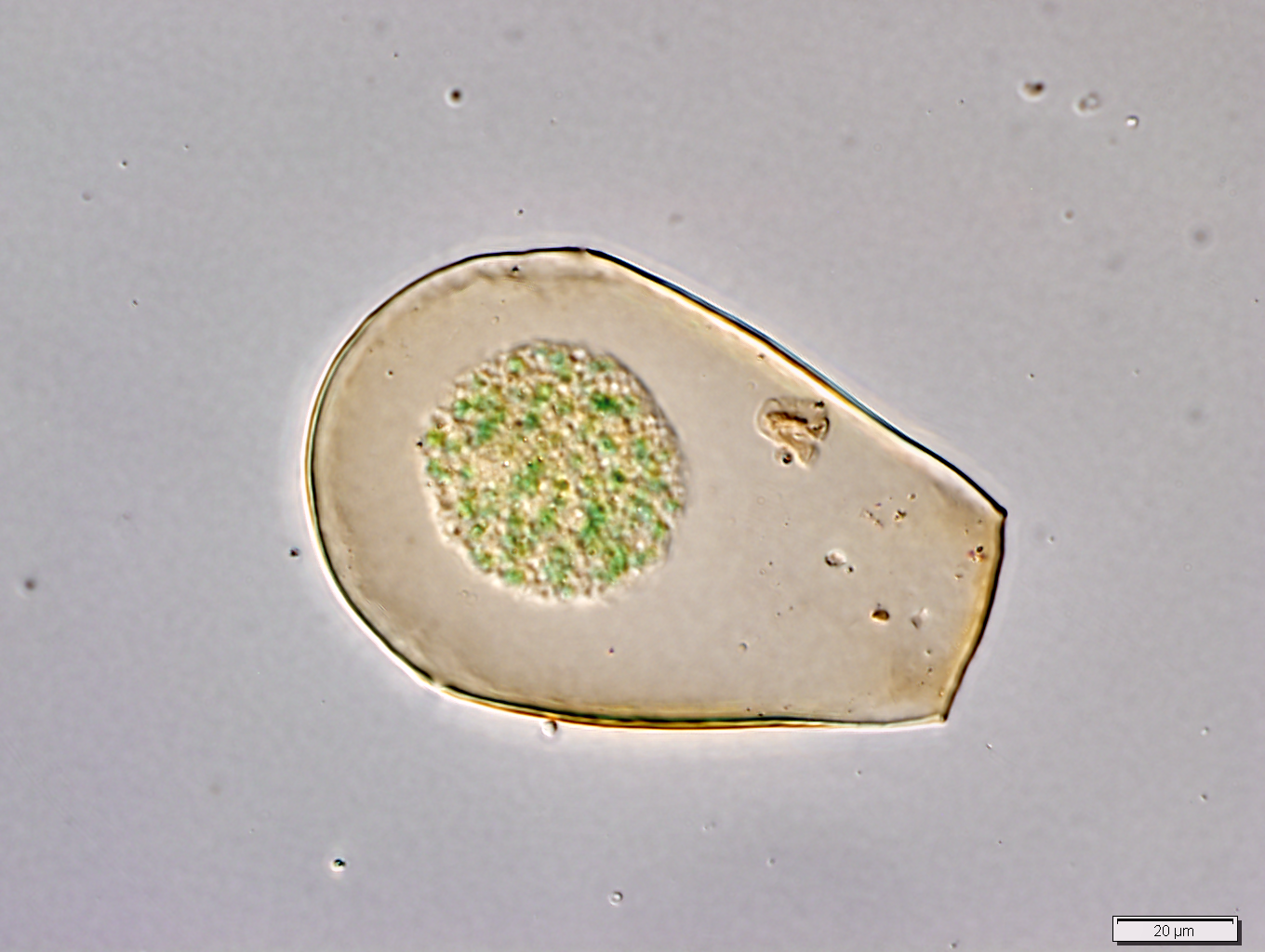
Organic material (Hyalosphenia)

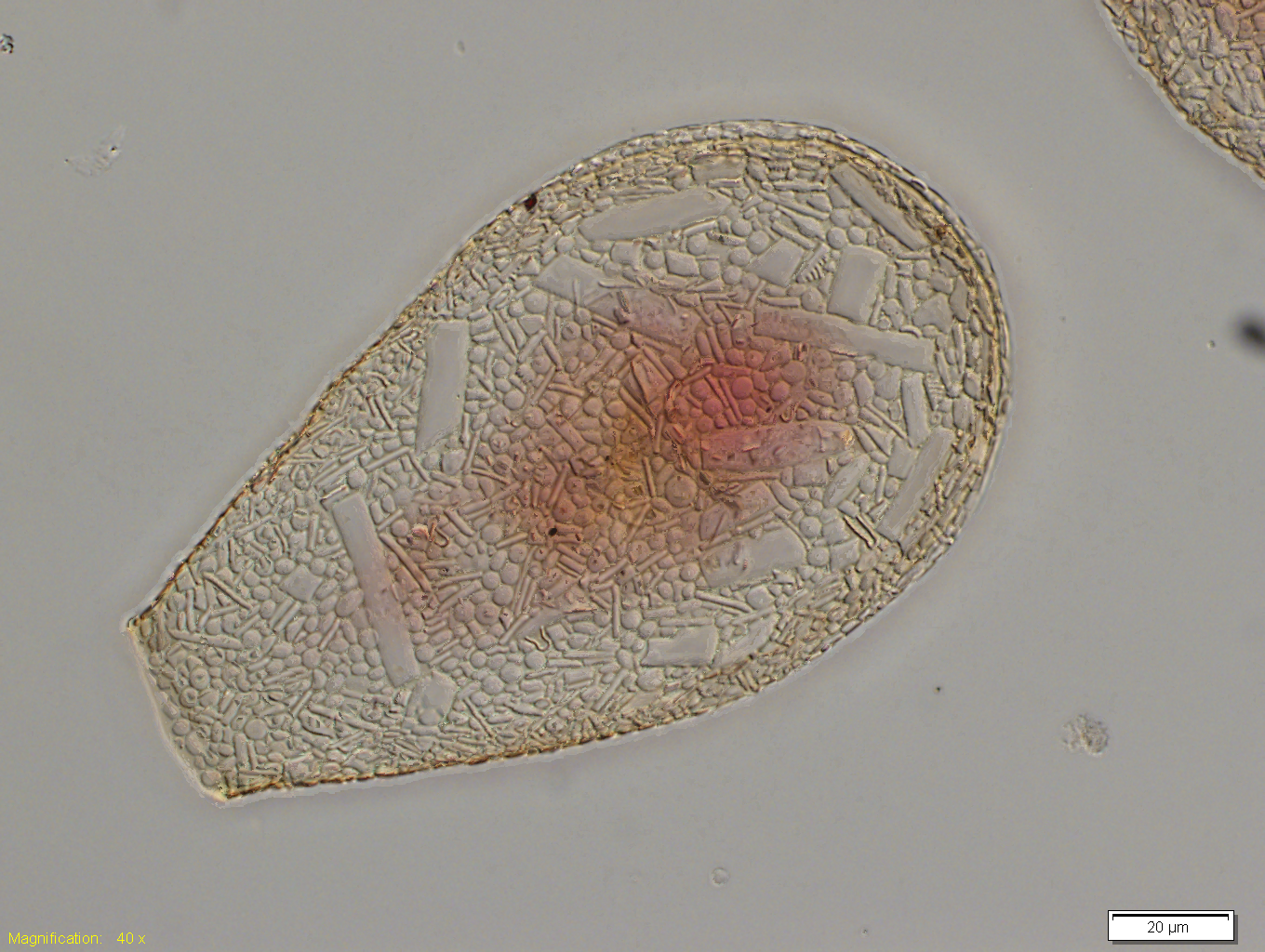
Siliceous elements (Planocarina)

The two main types of shell construction among hyalospheniids

== Ecology ==
Hyalospheniid amoebae are considered important bioindicators in environmental monitoring studies. Their sensitivity to environmental changes, such as atmospheric pollution, make them reliable indicators of hydrological changes. Together with the preservation of their shells over thousands of years, their environmental sensitivity gives them a prominent role in the reconstruction of the paleoclimate in peatlands, bogs and fens.

This family includes several of the most common, well-studied lobose testate amoebae. Its members are especially diverse and abundant in oligotrophic wetland ecosystems, such as peatlands dominated by Sphagnum mosses. Some of them can also be found in different mosses, freshwater habitats, and soil. Although multiple hyalospheniid species have a cosmopolitan distribution, many species are restricted to the Southern Hemisphere and the tropical range within the Northern Hemisphere.

One species, Hyalosphenia papilio, has been observed with photosynthetic endosymbionts (zoochlorellae). This species is an obligate mixotroph, living in constant association with intracellular symbionts belonging to the green algal class Trebouxiophyceae, specifically algae from the family Chlorellaceae.

== Evolution ==
- Arcellinida
  - Phryganellina
  - - Organoconcha
    - Glutinoconcha
      - Volnustoma
      - - - Hyalospheniformes
          - - Excentrosoma
            - Cylindrothecina
        - - Longithecina
          - Sphaerothecina

Position of hyalosphenids in the arcellinid phylogeny.

Hyalospheniidae is a family of Arcellinida, an order of lobose testate amoebae within the eukaryotic supergroup Amoebozoa. In contrast to filose testate amoebae, found within the supergroup Rhizaria (e.g. euglyphid amoebae), they present thicker pseudopods with blunt ends. It is the only family of the infraorder Hyalospheniformes, which belongs to the suborder Glutinoconcha. Glutinoconcha, which contains the majority of arcellinid species, evolved from a common ancestor with mineral agglutinated shells, in contrast to the organic shells of Organoconcha. In particular, Hyalospheniformes and Volnustoma, a different infraorder of Glutinoconcha, both evolved from ancestors with xenosomic agglutinated shells (i.e. composed of particles incorporated from an external source).

Through molecular clock approximations, the age of Hyalospheniidae was estimated in 2015 to be around 370 million years old, between the Devonian and the early Carboniferous. This molecular reconstruction suggests that hyalospheniids diversified after the middle Devonian, when the diversification of land plants formed extensive forests with an abundant production of organic matter and soils. Kleptosquamy, the ability of hyalosphenid amoebae to "steal" test scales from their prey, euglyphid amoebae, is hypothesized to be an ancestral trait within the family. This working hypothesis is based on the presence of kleptosquamy on most hyalospheniids. In addition to the molecular clock estimates, it has been suggested that 750–million-year-old vase-shaped microfossils could belong to this family.

== Systematics ==
=== History of taxonomy ===
There have been several attempts at classifying Hyalospheniidae among testate amoebae, as well as its internal classification. American paleontologist Joseph Leidy, in 1874, was possibly the first to notice common characteristics between the cells. He described the vase-shaped tests as composed of small siliceous particles ("discoid plates and minute rods") caught within an organic matrix, interpreted to be originated by the amoeba ("intrinsic"). He grouped those species within the genus Nebela, restricting them from the previously known genus of testate amoebae Difflugia. Instead, he described Difflugia species as having a "test composed of extraneous bodies, such as particles of quartzose sand, and diatom cases".

In 1877, German zoologist Franz Eilhard Schulze described the families Hyalosphenidae, Arcellidae, Quadrulidae and Difflugidae. Amoebae with an organic homogenous test such as Hyalosphenia were placed in Hyalospheniidiae, while Nebela was placed in Difflugidae, and Quadrulella in Quadrulidae.

In 1882, Taranek described the family Nebelidae to include amoebae with siliceous plates: Nebela, Lesquereusia, Quadrulella, Corythion (which was later excluded), Amphizonella, Cochliopodium, Hyalosphenia, Leptochlamys and Zonomyxa.

This family was redefined later in 1942 by Jung and organized into thirteen genera newly described by him: Alocodera, Apodera, Argynnia, Deflandria, Nebela, Leidyella, Penardiella, Physochila, Porosia, Pterygia, Quadrulella, Schaudinnia and Umbonaria. However, Jung did not designate type species in his classification, which invalidated all genera with more than one species. (Note: Due to article 13.3 of the International Code of Zoological Nomenclature, genera described after 1930 can only be validated if there is a type species designated to them.) Consequently, only monotypic genera such as Alocodera, Physochila and Porosia were recognized, and the remaining genera were absorbed by Nebela. Later, by assigning types, micropaleontologists Loeblich and Tappan validated Apodera and Certesella in 1961, and Vucetich validated Argynnia in 1974.

In 2002, German protozoologist Ralf Meisterfeld wrote the last review of the family based exclusively on morphological characters. He reclassified Nebela and similar genera into two families: Hyalospheniidae, composed of genera with rigid, chitinoid, organic tests (Hyalosphenia and Leptochlamys); and Nebelidae, composed of genera with tests constructed from plates of small euglyphids or diatom fragments (Apodera, Argynnia, Certesella, Nebela, Physochila, Porosia, Schoenbornia). Following a 1979 classification, he excluded the genus Quadrulella into the family Lesquereusiidae along with other arcellinid genera with self-secreted siliceous rods in their tests.

The first phylogenetic analyses of Arcellinida based on molecular data demonstrated that Nebela and Nebelidae were not monophyletic, i.e. did not form a clade or group of taxa evolved from a common ancestor without including other genera from Hyalospheniidae. Species of Apodera, Porosia, Nebela and Hyalosphenia were intermingled with each other in a clade known as "core Nebelas". Because of this result, and presence of distinguishing Hyalospheniidae traits within some Nebelidae, the two families were synonymised by Kosakyan et al. under the first name. In addition, many species of the polyphyletic Nebela were separated into new monophyletic genera, namely Padaungiella in 2012, Cornutheca, Gibbocarina, Longinebela, Mrabella and Planocarina in 2016, and finally Alabasta in 2018.

=== Classification ===
Hyalosphenid phylogeny

- - - - - - - Nebela
            - Quadrulella
          - - Certesella
            - ? Porosia
        - Longinebela
      - - Planocarina
        - Alabasta
    - - Hyalosphenia
      - - Cornutheca
        - - Mrabella
          - Gibbocarina
  - - Apodera
    - - Alocodera
      - Padaungiella

Based on a 2018 phylogenetic analysis of most genera, and a 2021 analysis that recovered Apodera as the sister group to Alocodera and Padaungiella. Porosia, excluded from the analyses, is considered a close relative of Certesella.

The current taxonomy of the family recognizes 14 genera, with a total of 97 species and sub-species:

- Alabasta Duckert, Blandenier, Kosakyan & Singer 2018 — 3 species.
- Alocodera Jung, 1942 — 1 species.
- Apodera Loeblich & Tappan, 1961 — 4 species.
- Certesella Loeblich & Tappan, 1961 — 5 species.
- Cornutheca Kosakyan, Lahr, Mulot, Meisterfeld, Mitchell & Lara, 2016 — 3 species.
- Gibbocarina Kosakyan, Lahr, Mulot, Meisterfeld, Mitchell & Lara, 2016 (=Umbonaria Jung, 1942) — 3 species.
- Hyalosphenia (Stein, 1857) Schulze, 1877 — 18 species.
- Longinebela Kosakyan, Lahr, Mulot, Meisterfeld, Mitchell & Lara, 2016 — 5 species.
- Mrabella Kosakyan, Lahr, Mulot, Meisterfeld, Mitchell & Lara, 2016 — 2 species.
- Nebela Leidy, 1874 em. Kosakyan, Lahr, Mulot, Meisterfeld, Mitchell & Lara, 2016 — 13 species.
- Padaungiella Lara et Todorov, 2012 (=Schaudinnia Jung, 1942) — 5 species.
- Planocarina Kosakyan, Lahr, Mulot, Meisterfeld, Mitchell & Lara, 2016 — 4 species.
- Porosia Jung, 1942 — 2 species.
- Quadrulella Cockerell, 1909 em. Kosakyan, Lahr, Mulot, Meisterfeld, Mitchell & Lara, 2016 — 19 species.
