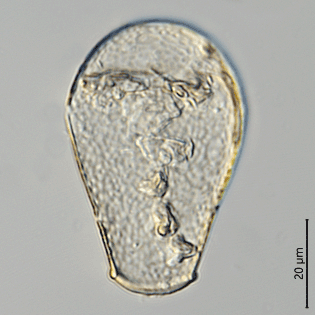
- A. militaris

Scientific classification
- Domain: Eukaryota
- Clade: Amorphea
- Phylum: Amoebozoa
- Class: Tubulinea
- Order: Arcellinida
- Family: Hyalospheniidae
- Genus: Alabasta; Duckert, Blandenier, Kosakyan & Singer 2018

Type species
- Alabasta militaris (Penard 1890) Duckert, Blandenier, Kosakyan & Singer 2018

Species
- A. kivuense; A. longicollis; A. militaris

= Alabasta =

Genus of testate amoebae

Alabasta (from Greek αλάβαστρος (alábastros) 'alabaster') is a genus of arcellinid testate amoebae belonging to the family Hyalospheniidae. It contains species with an elongated test and a strongly curved "pseudostome" (the test opening) with a flare and a notch in narrow view. These species previously belonged to the genus Nebela, but were later found to be a distinct monophyletic group different from Nebela. It is the sister group to Planocarina.

== Morphology ==
Members of Alabasta have a rigid, elongated test that is colourless or yellowish, with a maximum width at about two thirds of the distance from the test's aperture and sides, then thinner towards the aperture. The test is proteinaceous, often incorporating silica scales taken from euglyphid preys. The pseudostome (i.e. aperture) is strongly convex with a flare (i.e. fan shape) in broad view and a deep notch in profile view. Lateral pores are usually present at about one third of the distance from the pseudostome to the fundus (i.e. the bottom of the test, opposite to the aperture).

== Taxonomy ==
Alabasta was described in 2018 by Clément Duckert, Quentin Blandenier, Anush Kosakyan and David Singer. The description of the genus was published in the European Journal of Protistology.

=== Etymology ===
The genus was named after the greek word αλάβαστρος (alábastros), as a reference to the diaphanous and yellowish appearance of the test. It is also related to Alabasta, a fictitious desert island described in the manga One Piece, which is reminiscent of the ecological preferences of Alabasta militaris, used in the monitoring of peatlands as an indicator of dryness.

=== Classification ===
There are 3 species of Alabasta:

- Alabasta kivuense (Gauthier-Lievre & Thomas 1961) Duckert, Blandenier, Kosakyan & Singer 2018 (=Nebela kivuense Gauthier-Lievre & Thomas 1961)
- Alabasta longicollis (Penard 1890) Duckert, Blandenier, Kosakyan & Singer 2018 (=Nebela longicollis Penard 1890)
- Alabasta militaris (Penard 1890) Duckert, Blandenier, Kosakyan & Singer 2018 (=Nebela militaris Penard 1890; =N. bursella Taranek 1881; =Nebela americana var. bryophila Van Oye 1933)
