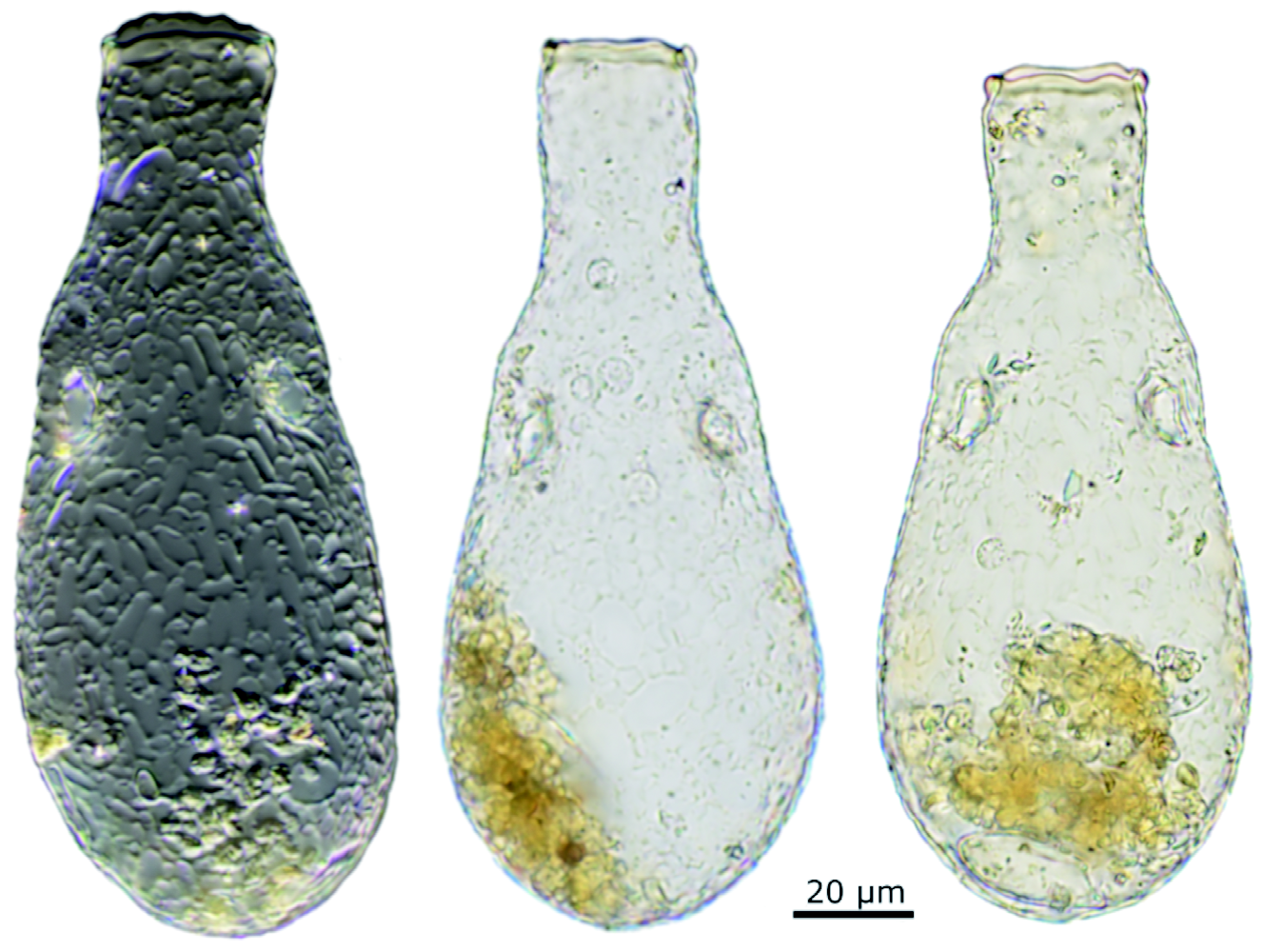
- Certesella larai specimens from Chile

Scientific classification
- Domain: Eukaryota
- Phylum: Amoebozoa
- Class: Tubulinea
- Order: Arcellinida
- Family: Hyalospheniidae
- Genus: Certesella; Loeblich & Tappan, 1961

Type species
- Certesella martiali (Certes, 1891) Loeblich & Tappan, 1961

Species
- C. australis; C. certesi; C. larai; C. martiali; C. murrayi

Synonyms
- Penardiella Jung, 1942 (not Penardiella Kahl, 1930)

= Certesella =

Genus of testate amoebae

Certesella is a genus of testate amoebae belonging to the family Hyalospheniidae. It is characterized by a test that presents two symmetrical holes near the opening, and by the presence of internal teeth within the test. It contains four species previously assigned to Nebela, as well as one species discovered in 2021.

== Distribution ==
Certesella species are predominantly found in the Southern Hemisphere, previously Gondwanaland. Abundant locations include southern Chile, Argentina, Antarctica, Australia, New Zealand, Java, Sumatra, New Guinea, Colombia and Marion Island. Two species, however, have been sampled from the Northern Hemisphere: C. certesi in Mexico, and C. larai in Dominican Republic. They inhabit peatlands of Sphagnum mosses with wet acidic soils.

== Morphology ==
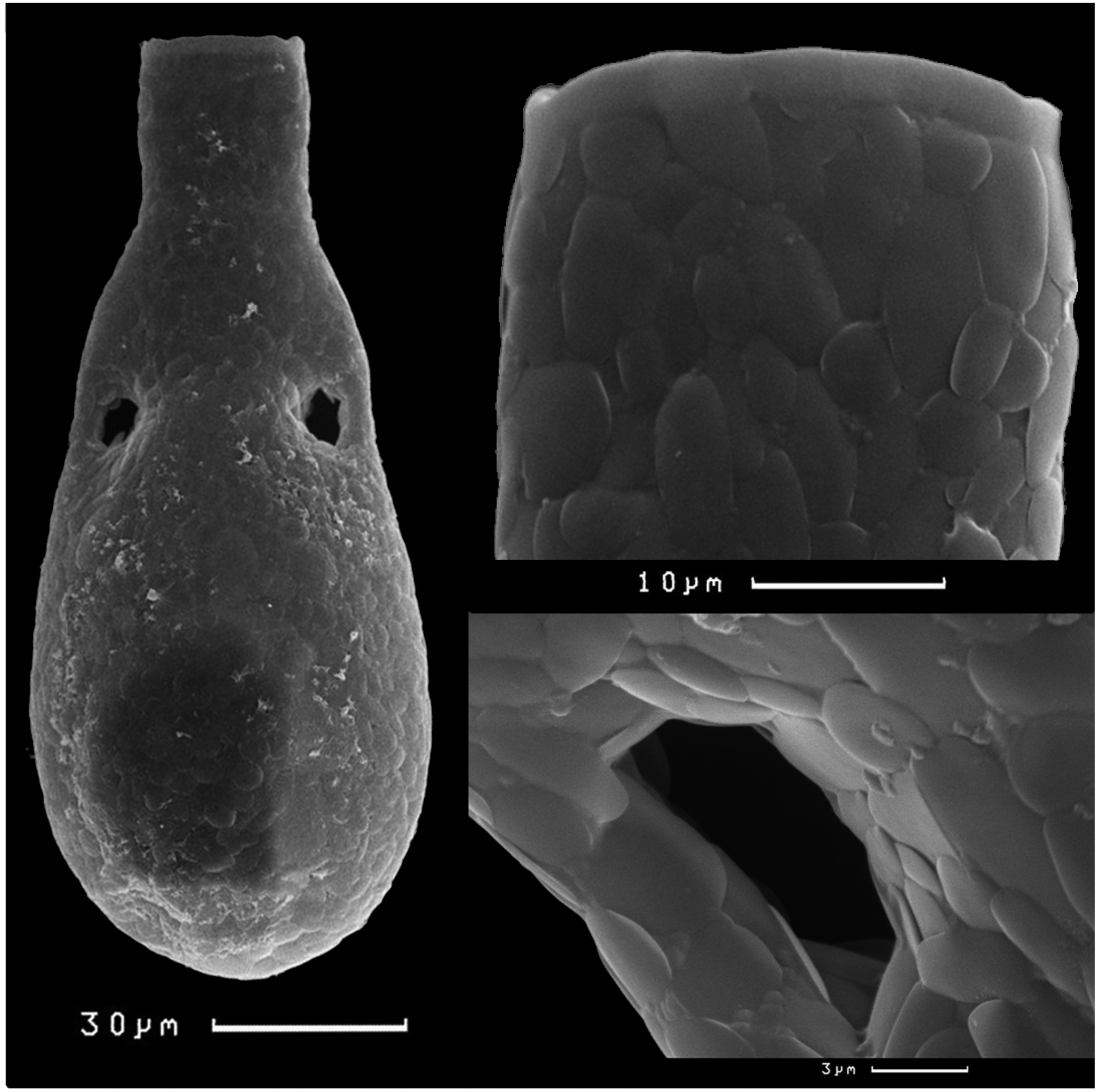
SEM image of Certesella larai

Certesella is a genus of eukaryotic unicellular arcellinid amoebae with a pyriform or flask-shaped test. The base of the test, which is the posterior end, is rounded. The aperture, located at the anterior end, is oval, surrounded by a smooth chitinous lip. The inner side of the test presents several conical denticles or "teeth" that are characteristic of the genus. There are two symmetrical circular holes that go through the anterior half of the test, something also particular to this genus The test itself is compressed when viewed laterally, and is composed of very thin, almost transparent, polygonal or circular plates.

== Taxonomy ==
The genus, originally named Penardiella Jung, 1942, contains species previously assigned to Nebela, a genus of the same family Hyalospheniidae. However, because a genus of ciliates already used the name Penardiella since 1930 (i.e. it was a homonym), it was later renamed to Certesella in 1961 by micropaleontologists Loeblich and Tappan. It encompasses the following species:

- Certesella australis (Vucetich, 1973) Vucetich, 1978 [=Nebela australis Vucetich, 1973]
- Certesella certesi (Penard, 1911) Vucetich, 1978 [=Nebela collaris var. Certes, 1882-1883; Nebela certesi Penard, 1907-1909; Penardiella certesi Jung, 1942]
- Certesella larai Bobrov, Duckert & A.D. Mitchell, 2021
- Certesella martiali (Certes, 1889) Loeblich & Tappan, 1961 [=Nebela martiali Certes, 1889; Penardiella martiali (Certes, 1889) Jung, 1942]
- Certesella murrayi (Wailes, 1913) [=Nebela murrayi Wailes, 1913]
