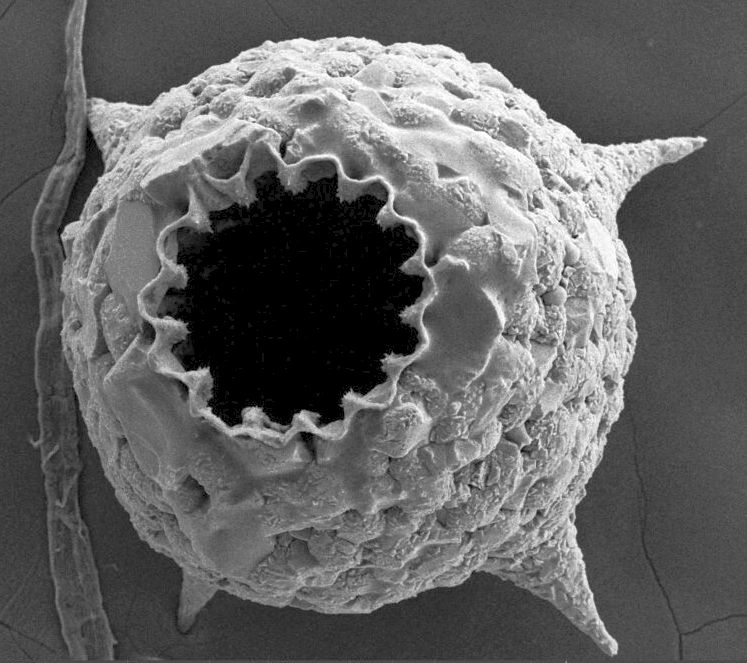
- The shell (test) of Netzelia corona

Scientific classification
- Domain: Eukaryota
- Phylum: Amoebozoa
- Class: Tubulinea
- Superorder: Eulobosia
- Order: Arcellinida; Kent 1880

= Arcellinida =

Arcellinida Temporal range: Tonian–Present

Order of Amoebozoa

Arcellinid testate amoebae or Arcellinida, Arcellacean or lobose testate amoebae are single-celled protists partially enclosed in a simple test (shell).

Arcellinid testate amoebae are commonly found in soils, leaf litter, peat bogs and near/in fresh water. They use their pseudopodia, a temporary cell extension, for moving and taking in food. Like most amoebae, they are generally believed to reproduce asexually via binary fission. However a recent review suggests that sexual recombination may be the rule rather than the exception in amoeboid protists in general, including the Arcellinid testate amoebae.

== Morphology ==
Representation of an arcellinid: 1. Test, cemented sand, diatom frustules; 2. Contractile vacuole, regulates the quantity of water inside a cell; 3. Mitochondrion; creates ATP (energy) for the cell (flat cristae); 4. Nucleolus; 5. Golgi apparatus, packages proteins; 6. Endoplasmic reticulum, the transport network for molecules going to specific parts of the cell; 7. Digestive Vacuole; 8. Lysosome, holds enzymes; 9. Phagosome, vesicle formed around a particle (prey not to scale); 10. Xenosome, bacterium living inside cytoplasm; 11. Vesicles; 12. Lobopodia, a pseudopod or arm-like projection made of cytoplasm; 13. Prey (not to scale)

Arcellinida always have a shell or test. The tests lie outside the cell membrane and consist of organic or mineral materials that are either secreted or incorporate external particles. The test has a single main opening.

Simple tests are made by secretion (autogenous tests), agglutination of foreign material (xenogenous tests), or sometimes a combination of both. Past environmental changes can be determined by analysing the composition of fossil tests, including the reconstruction of past climate change. Testate amoebae species have been used to reconstruct hydrological changes over the late Holocene, as a result of individual species possessing a narrow tolerance for ecohydrological conditions such as water-table depth or pH.

== Evolutionary history ==
Fossils of arcellinid testate amoebae date back to the Tonian stage of the Proterozoic, around 789-759 million years ago. The fossils indicate that by 730 million years ago, arcellinids had already diversified into major lineages.

Testate amoebae are theorized to be mostly polyphyletic (coming from more than one ancestral type), but testaceafilosea, one group of testate amoebae, are theorized to be monophyletic. Ancient tests of terrestrial fauna are commonly found in fossilized amber, although mid-Cretaceous testate amoeba (i.e., Difflugia, Cucurbitella) have been found in ancient lake sediments. It is likely that the group has evolved minimally over the course of the Phanerozoic.

== Classification ==
Phylogeny of Arcellinida in 2019

- Arcellinida
  - Phryganellina
  - - Organoconcha
    - Glutinoconcha
      - Volnustoma
      - - Hyalospheniformes
        - - Excentrostoma
          - - Sphaerothecina
            - Longithecina

Phylogeny of Arcellinida in 2022

- Arcellinida
  - Phryganellina
  - - Organoconcha
    - Glutinoconcha
      - Volnustoma
      - - - Hyalospheniformes
          - - Excentrosoma
            - Cylindrothecina
        - - Longithecina
          - Sphaerothecina

The classification of Arcellinida, as of 2019:

- Suborder Phryganellina Bovee 1985
  - Family Phryganellidae Jung 1942
    - Phryganella Penard 1902
  - Family Cryptodifflugiidae Jung 1942
    - ?Prantlitina Vasicek & Ruzicka 1957
    - ?Pseudocucurbitella Gauthier-Lievre & Thomas 1960
    - ?Pseudowailesella Sudzuki 1979
    - Cryptodifflugia Penard 1890 [Difflugiella Cash 1904; Geococcus Francé 1913 non Green 1902]
    - Meisterfeldia Bobrov 2016
    - Wailesella Deflandre 1928
- Suborder Organoconcha Lahr et al. 2019
  - Family Microchlamyiidae Ogden 1985
    - Microchlamys Cockerell 1911 [Pseudochlamys Claparede & Lachmann 1859 non Lacordaire 1848 non Comas 1977]
    - Pyxidicula Ehrenberg 1838 non Ehrenberg 1834 non Strelnikova & Nikolajev 1986
    - Spumochlamys Kudryavtsev & Hausmann 2007
- Suborder Glutinoconcha Lahr et al. 2019
  - Infraorder Volnustoma Lahr et al. 2019
    - Family Heleoperidae Jung 1942
      - Awerintzewia Schouteden 1906
      - Heleopera Leidy 1879
  - Infraorder Hyalospheniformes Lahr et al. 2019
    - Family Hyalospheniidae Schulze, 1977 [Nebelidae Taranek 1882]
      - ?Apolimia Korganova 1987
      - ?Deflandria Jung 1942
      - ?Heleoporella Couteaux 1978
      - ?Leidyella Jung 1942
      - ?Metaheleopera Bartos 1954
      - ?Marsipos Medioli et al. 1990
      - ?Paranebela Jung 1942
      - ?Penardiella Kahl 1930
      - ?Pseudogeamphorella Décloitre 1964 nomen nudum
      - ?Pseudohyalosphenia Stepanek 1967 nomen nudum
      - ?Pterygia Jung 1942 non Roeding 1798 non Link 1807 non Laporte 1832
      - ?Schaudinnia Jung 1942 non Schulze 1900
      - ?Umbonaria Jung 1942
      - Alabasta Duckert et al. 2018
      - Alocodera Jung 1942a
      - Apodera Loeblich & Tappan 1961
      - Certesella Loeblich & Tappan 1961
      - Cornutheca Kosakyan et al. 2016
      - Gibbocarina Kosakyan et al. 2016
      - Hyalosphenia Stein 1859
      - Longinebela Kosakyan et al. 2016
      - Mrabella Kosakyan et al. 2016
      - Nebela Leidy 1875
      - Padaungiella Lara & Todorov 2012
      - Planocarina Kosakyan et al. 2016
      - Porosia Jung 1942
      - Quadrulella Cockerell 1909 [Quadrula Schulze 1875 non Rafinesque 1820]
  - Infraorder Excentrostoma Lahr et al. 2019
    - ?Centropyxiella Valkanov 1970
    - ?Oopyxis Jung 1942
    - Family Centropyxidae
      - Armipyxis Dekhtiar 2009
      - Centropyxis Stein 1857 [Echinopyxis Claparede & Lachmann 1859 non Pantocsek 1913; Collaripyxidia Zivkovic 1975; Toquepyxis Laminger 1971]
      - Conicocassis Nasser & Patterson 2015
      - Proplagiopyxis Schönborn 1964
    - Family Plagiopyxidae
      - Bullinularia Deflandre 1953 [Bullinula Penard 1911]
      - Geoplagiopyxis Chardez 1961
      - Hoogenraadia GauthierLievre & Thomas 1958
      - Paracentropyxis Bonnet 1960
      - Plagiopyxis Penard 1910
      - Planhoogenraadia Bonnet 1977
      - Protoplagiopyxis Bonnet 1962
  - Infraorder Longithecina Lahr et al. 2019
    - Family Lesquereusiidae [Paraquadrulidae Deflandre 1953]
      - Fabalesquereusia Snegovaya & Alekperov 2005
      - Lesquereusia Schlumberger 1845
      - Microquadrula Golemansky 1968
      - Paraquadrula Deflandre 1932
      - Pomoriella Golemansky 1970
    - Family Difflugiidae Wallich 1864
      - ?Lagenodifflugia Medioli & Scott 1983
      - ?Maghrebia Gauthier-Lievre & Thomas 1958
      - ?Pentagonina Bovee & Jahn 1974 [Pentagonia Gauthier-Lievre & Thomas 1958 non Cozzens 1846; Falsidifflugia Haman 1988]
      - ?Pseudopontigulasia Oye 1956
      - ?Sexangularia Awerintzew 1906
      - ?Suiadifflugia Green 1975
      - ?Zivkovicia Ogden 1987
      - Armatodifflugia Snegovaya & Alekperov 2005
      - Difflugia Leclere 1815 ex Lamarck 1816
      - Mediolus Patterson 2014
      - Nabranella Snegovaya & Alekperov 2009
      - Pelecyamoeba Snegovaya & Alekperov 2005
      - Pontigulasia Rhumbler 1895
      - Pseudonebela Gauthier-Lievre 1954 non Schönborn 1964
  - Infraorder Sphaerothecina Kosakyan et al. 2016
    - ?Cornuapyxis Couteaux & Chardez 1981
    - ?Cucurbitella Penard 1902 non Walpers 1846
    - ?Ellipsopyxella Bonnet 1975
    - ?Ellipsopyxis Bonnet 1965
    - ?Protocucurbitella Gauthier-Lievre & Thomas 1960 non Naumov
    - Family Distomatopyxidae Bonnet 1970
      - Distomatopyxis Bonnet 1970
    - Family Lamtopyxidae Bonnet 1974
      - Lamtopyxis Bonnet 1974
    - Family Netzeliidae Kosakyan et al. 2016 [Cyclopyxidae Schönborn 1989]
      - Cyclopyxis Bonnet 1953
      - Netzelia Ogden 1979
    - Family Arcellidae Ehrenberg 1832
      - Antarcella Ehrenberg 1838
      - Arcella Deflandre 1928 [Arcellina Carter 1856 non DuPlessis 1876 non Haeckel 1894; Cyphidium Ehrenberg 1837 non Magnus 1875; Leptocystis Playfair 1918]
      - Galeripora González-Miguéns et al. 2021
    - Trigonopyxidae Loeblich 1964
      - Geopyxella Bonnet & Thomas 1955
      - Trigonopyxis Penard 1912

Arcellinida incertae sedis:

- Argynnia Vucetich, 1974
- Awerintzewia Schouteden, 1906
- Geamphorella Bonnet, 1959
- Jungia Loeblich & Tappan 1961
- Lagenodifflugia Medioli & Scott, 1983
- Lamtoquadrula Bonnet 1975
- Leptochlamys West 1901
- Maghrebia Gauthier-Lievre & Thomas, 1960
- Ochros Medioli et al. 1990
- †Palaeoleptochlamys Strullu-Derrien et al. 2019
- Physochila Jung 1942
- Pseudawerintzewia Bonnet 1959
- Sacculus Medioli et al. 1990 non Gosse 1851 non Hirase 1927 non Neviani 1930
- Schoenbornia Decloitre 1964
- Swabia
- Family Bipseudostomatidae Snegovaya & Alekperov 2005
  - Bipseudostomatella Snegovaya & Alekperov 2005
  - Gomocollariella Snegovaya & Alekperov 2005
- Family Mississippiellidae Huddleston & Haman 1985
  - Mississippiella Haman 1982
- Family Shamkiriidae Snegovaya & Alekperov 2005
  - Shamkiriella Snegovaya & Alekperov 2005
