= Xenosome =

Bacterium that lives in the body of some marine protozoans

A xenosome is a bacterium that lives in the body of some marine protozoans. It primarily refers to bacterial invaders of the cytoplasm of a single genus of marine scuticociliates. They are found in ciliates, sometimes with a methanogenic role inside anaerobic ciliates.

In 1985, researcher John Corliss proposed to expand the definition of the term to include all DNA-containing, membrane-bounded bodies or organelles—prokaryotic or eukaryotic in original nature—found within the cytoplasm or nucleus of eukaryotic cells of any or all kinds, regardless of whether the occupation was temporary or permanent.
