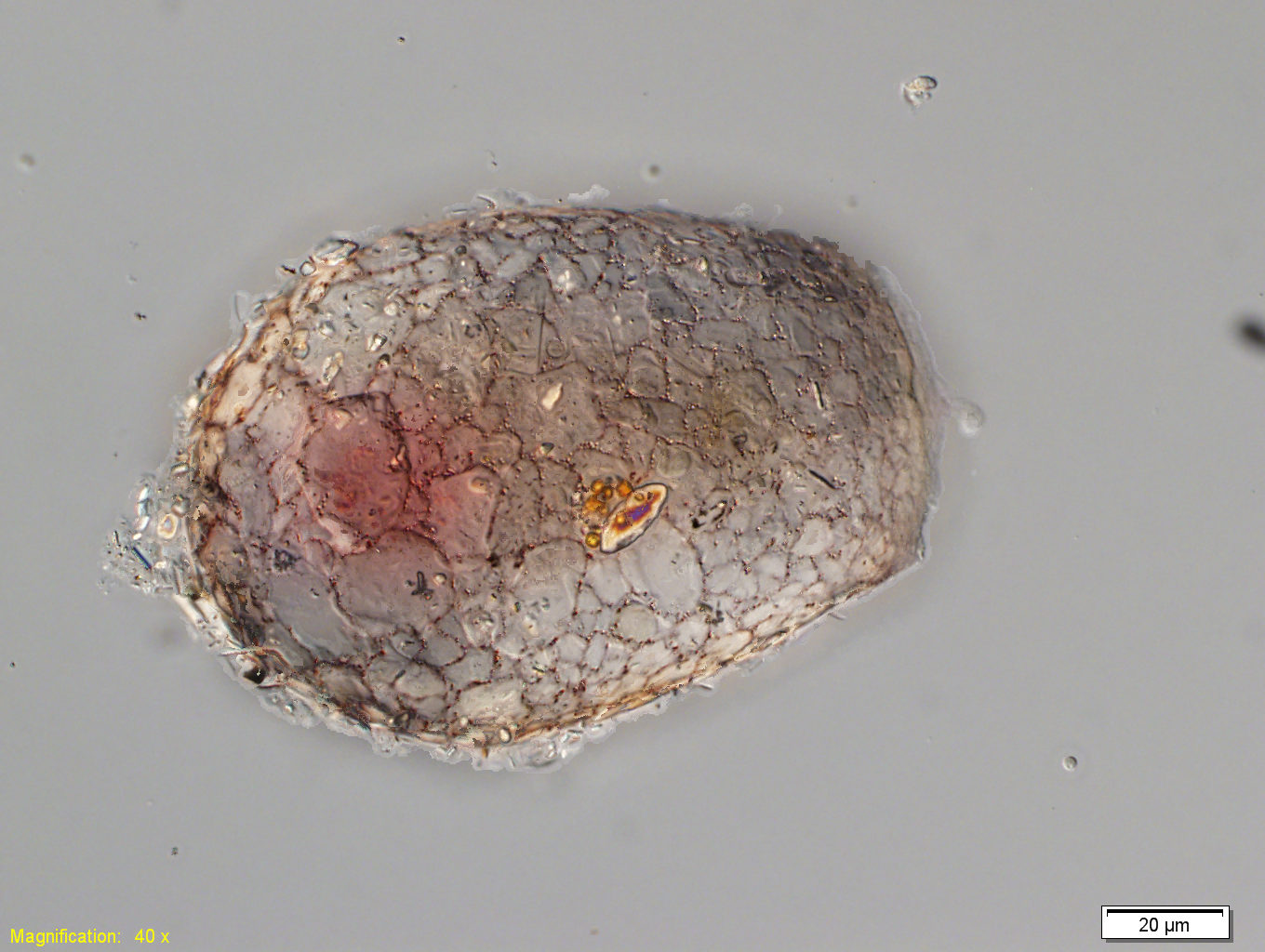
- Heleopera petricola

Scientific classification
- Domain: Eukaryota
- Phylum: Amoebozoa
- Class: Tubulinea
- Order: Arcellinida
- Suborder: Glutinoconcha
- Infraorder: Volnustoma; Lahr et al. 2019
- Family: Heleoperidae; Jung 1942
- Genus: Heleopera; Leidy 1879

Type species
- Heleopera sphagni Leidy 1879

= Heleopera =

Genus of protists

Heleopera (from Ancient Greek helos 'a bog' and pera 'a bag') is a genus of testate amoebae belonging to the order Arcellinida. It is the sole genus within family Heleoperidae and infraorder Volnustoma, which in turn belong to the suborder Glutinoconcha. It is characterized by a conspicuous slit-like test aperture.

== Description ==
Heleopera is a genus of testate amoebae, a type of unicellular amoeboid protists that are enclosed in a shell known as the test. In particular, it belongs to the order Arcellinida, which includes testate amoebae with lobose (round, blunt-ended) pseudopods. The genus is characterized by an ovoid, laterally compressed test composed of a cancellated chitinoid membrane with a reticulate appearance of mostly dotted lines, often incorporating particles of sand. The test opening, or 'mouth', is large, elliptical and has a terminal position. Through this opening, the organism extends numerous digitiform pseudopods.

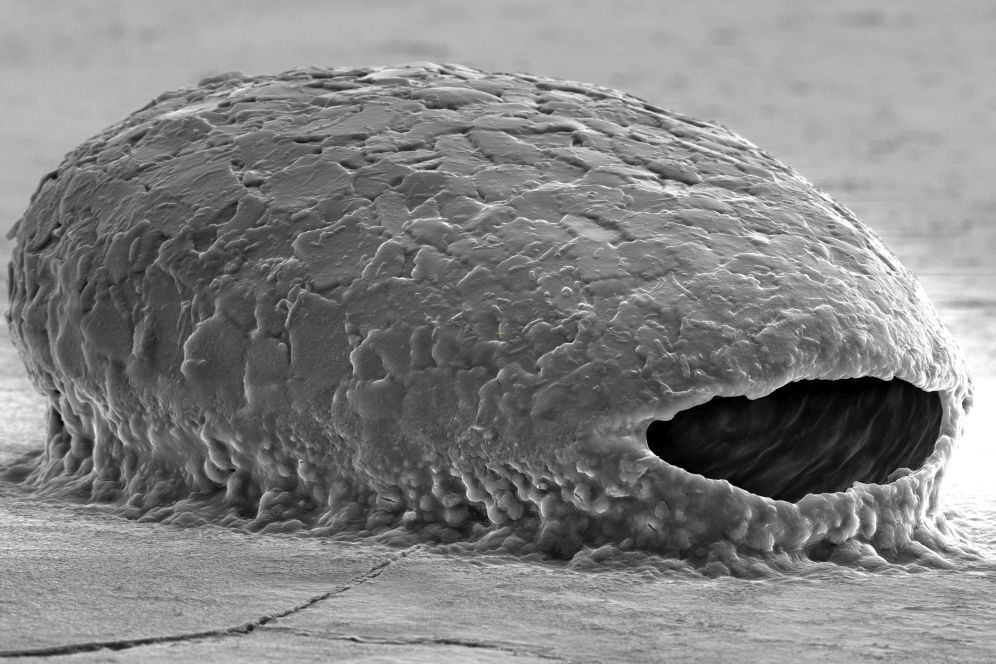
Heleopera sphagnicola shell

The conspicuous slit-like (laterally compressed) terminal opening found in this genus is what distinguishes the infraorder Volnustoma from other groups of Arcellinida. In addition, the tests are reinforced with mineral particles.

== Systematics ==
=== Taxonomy ===
The genus Heleopera was described by American paleontologist Joseph Leidy in his 1879 book Fresh-water rhizopods of North America. He constructed the generic name from the Greek words helos, meaning bog, in reference to swamps, its frequent habitat; and pera, meaning bag, in reference to the shape of its test. He transferred the species Nebela sphagni to this new genus and assigned it as the type species, but also changed the specific epithet to picta, thus modifying its name to Heleopera picta. In the 1909 volume of The British freshwater Rhizopoda and Heliozoa, British naturalist James Cash reinstated the epithet sphagni, arguing that the original epithet of a given species should be conserved if it is not preoccupied by an earlier name. Consequently, the current accepted name of the type species is Heleopera sphagni.

In 1942, a family was proposed to accommodate this genus, Heleoperidae. The validity of this family was questioned during the first years of molecular phylogenetic analyses of testate amoebae, because the genus itself was apparently paraphyletic. As a consequence, Heleopera was considered an incertae sedis taxon within the order Arcellinida, containing most lobose testate amoebae. In 2019, with better phylogenetic resolution, the order was divided into various monophyletic suborders and infraorders, and Heleoperidae was placed in its own infraorder Volnustoma. It remains the only family in this infraorder, which in turn belongs to the suborder Glutinoconcha.

=== Species ===
The genus includes 11 accepted species:

- Heleopera baetica Soler-Zamora, González-Miguéns & Lara 2021
- Heleopera lata Cash & Hopkinson 1909
- Heleopera lucida (Penard 1890) Porfirio-Sousa et al. 2024

= Difflugia lucida Penard 1890

- Heleopera nodosa Wailes 1912
- Heleopera penardi Bonnet & Thomas 1955
- Heleopera petricola Leidy 1879
- Heleopera rosea Penard 1890
- Heleopera sordida Penard 1910
- Heleopera sphagni (Leidy 1879) Cash 1909

= Difflugia (Nebela) sphagni Leidy 1874
= Nebela sphagni Leidy 1876
= Heleopera picta Leidy 1879

- Heleopera steppica Useros & Lara 2023
- Heleopera sylvatica Penard 1890
