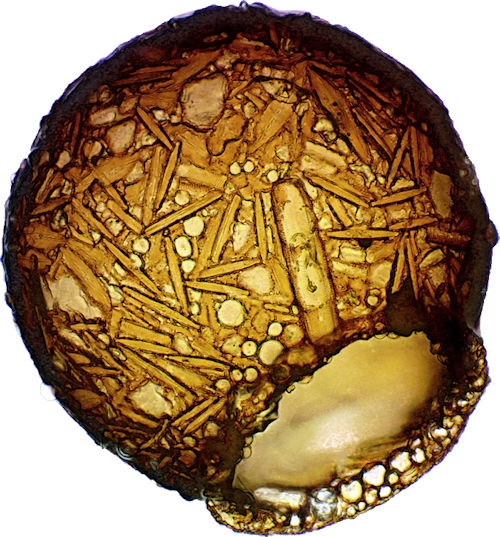
- Difflugia urceolata

Scientific classification
- Domain: Eukaryota
- Phylum: Amoebozoa
- Class: Tubulinea
- Order: Arcellinida
- Family: Difflugiidae
- Genus: Difflugia; Leclerc, 1815

= Difflugia =

Large genus of protists

Difflugia is the largest genus of Arcellinida, one of several groups of Tubulinea within the eukaryote supergroup Amoebozoa. Arcellinida species produce shells or tests from mineral particles or biogenic elements (e.g. diatom frustules) and are thus commonly referred to as testate amoebae or shelled amoebae. Difflugia are particularly common in marshes and other freshwater habitats.

== History ==
The genus Difflugia was initially discovered in 1815 by L, Leclerc, but its infra-generic classification as a group is still unclear. The genus Difflugia is the oldest and most diverse of the testate amoebae. It contains more than 300 species and countless subspecies since even minor differences in morphology result in classification as a new species. In 1958, Gauthier-Lièvre and Thomas divided the genus into 10 groups depending on difference in shell morphology. These 10 groups are based on a survey conducted of the African species of Difflugia The 10 shell shape classifications are lobed, collared, compressed, urceolate, globose, ovoid-globose, elongate, acute angled, horned and pyriform.

== Taxonomy ==
There have been issues coming to a specific consensus about the taxonomy of the genus Difflugia. In 1988, an attempt to characterize and create a phylogenetic tree based upon the composition of the shell. However, with additional evidence it was found that this is not actually a useful characteristic to evaluate by. In addition, most initial descriptions of Difflugia speciation were completed using light microscopy and therefore lacked the technology to show the details of test structure and composition. The invention of scanning electron microscopy allows for more detail and improved the taxonomic work surrounding Difflugia. Studies surrounding Difflugia have been centered around species found mostly in Europe and Africa.
Molecular phylogenetic analyses have revealed that the genus Difflugia, as traditionally defined, is not a monophyletic group. As a result, several globular and oviform species have been transferred to the genus Netzelia and other species have been aggregated in a new genus Cylindrifflugia.

External videos
- Testate Amoebas: Blobby, Modest Shell Dwellers – Journey to the Microcosmos

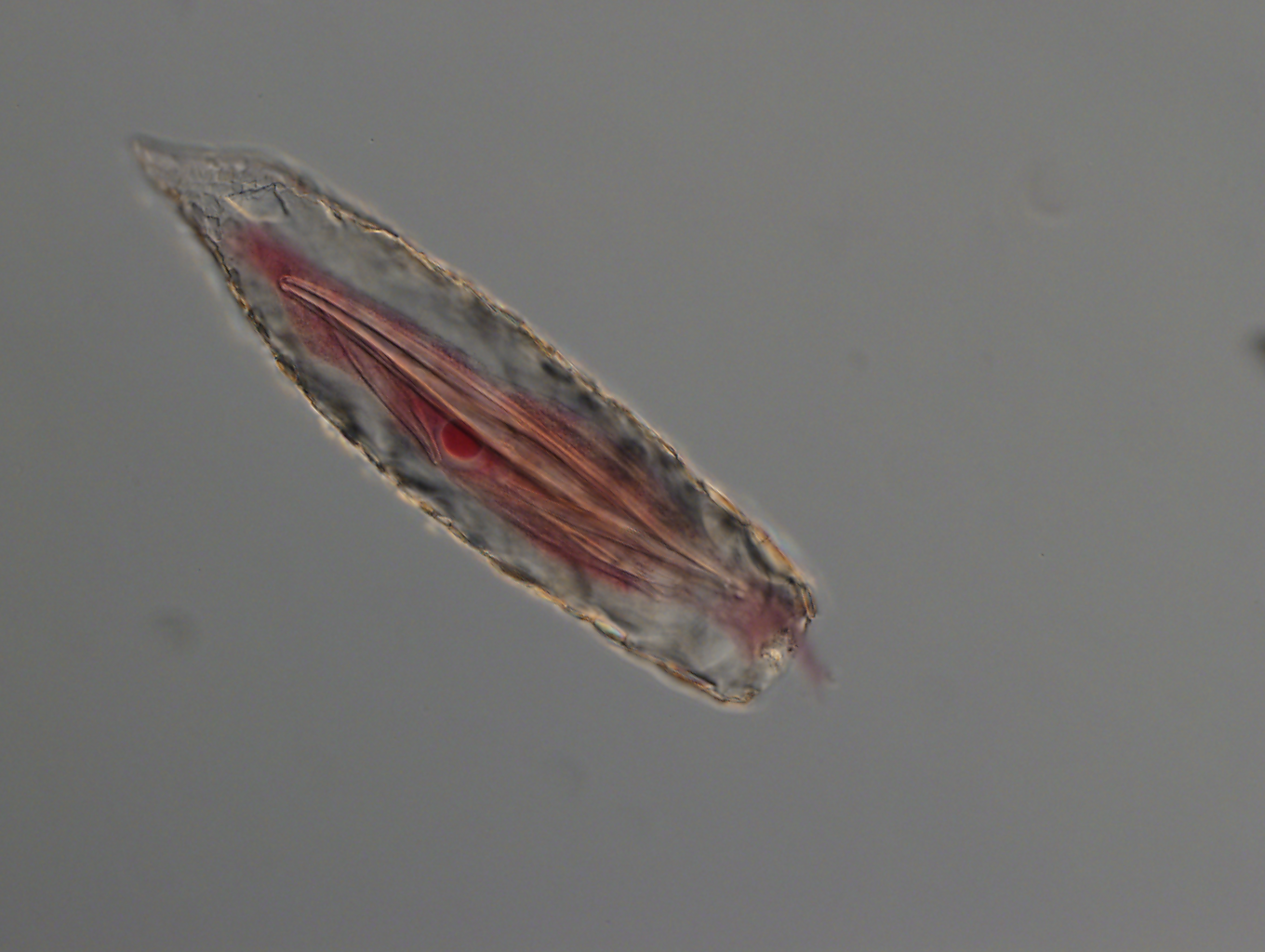
Difflugia scalpellum

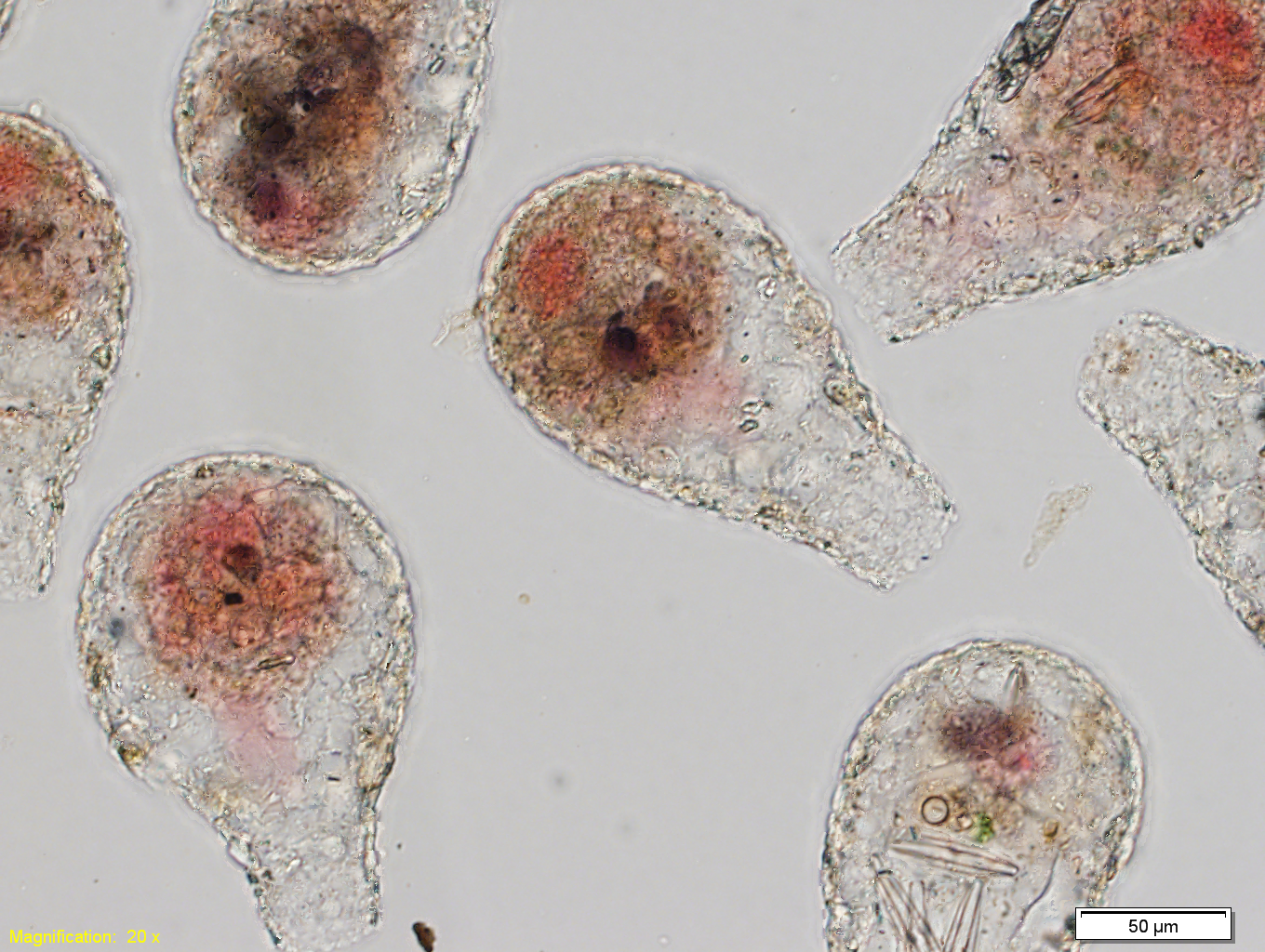
Difflugia pyriformis

The catalogue of Difflugia species continues to expand with discoveries in under-explored geographical regions. For example, Difflugia quangtrani was described in 2022 from freshwater bodies in the Central Highlands and South-Central Coast of Vietnam. This species is characterized by a radially symmetrical, globular or ovoid main body covered with fine sand grains and a distinct short neck.

== Structure ==
Difflugia are testate amoebae with an agglutinate shell. The test can be composed of various different mineral particles depending on the varying environment. These mineral particles are collectively called xenosomes. All species of the genus Difflugia acquire their xenosomes, from the environment in which they inhabit. Difflugia often have species specific tests, which are arranged based on the specific shape and size. Most species of Difflugia only contain one nucleus but there are a select few that are multinucleated. In the larger species the nucleus can be vesicular as opposed to the regularly ovular nucleus. All species also contain an epipodium which is a terminal aperture in the protist's structure. The size of Difflugia is found to range from 15μm all the way up to 500μm.

During cell division, the particles collected that have been used to produce the test are directly passed on to the daughter cell. Strength of the test is quite variable between the Difflugia species and the strength of the test can be separated into three categories; robust, intermediate and fragile. Robust tests are found to result in a shell with an irregular shape in comparison to the rest of the genus. Shells which are a part of the fragile category are most likely to be constructed from diatom crystals.

Difflugia does not pick particles randomly. Recent studies using advanced microscopes show that Difflugia acts like a skilled builder. It puts heavier, block-shaped minerals near the opening of its shell to keep it stable and balanced. It also uses lighter, flat minerals at the back of the shell.

Recent studies employing SEM-BEX (backscattered electron and X-ray) mapping have provided new insights into mineral selection during test building in Difflugia. Analyses of specimens from Scotland show that these amoebae organize mineral grains according to their physical properties. Dense framework silicates such as quartz and feldspar tend to be placed toward the apertural end, while lighter sheet silicates, including muscovite and kaolin, are arranged closer to the fundus. The same study reports the first documented instance of intentional incorporation of kaolin particles into Difflugia tests.

== Habitat and ecology ==
The environment conditions in which Difflugia lives is important to consider as it greatly influences shell morphology of the species. Shell composition depends on environmental pH and what materials are available. Difflugia can be found living in a large variety of habitats such as freshwater sediments, dry mosses and soil, or lakes. Some species are planktonic and switch to a benthic phase during the winter in which they stay immobile near the bottom of the body of water. One way environment can influence characteristics of Difflugia is that there are several freshwater species, which have green endosymbionts or zoochlorellae. The species Difflugia that contain endosymbionts are not considered to be heterotrophs, but instead mixotrophs because they combine being autotrophic and heterotrophic. The source of food depends on the environment but across the genus it is found to be mainly algae and fungi. Smaller species of Difflugia are found to consume bacteria as well as algae and fungi.

Freshwater testate amoebae from the Central Highlands and the South-Central Coast of Vietnam exhibit clear ecological differentiation among habitats. Planktonic samples generally contain higher species richness of Difflugia and other testate amoebae than benthic samples, and community composition varies among reservoirs, rivers, and wetlands. A pronounced distance–decay pattern is also present, with communities becoming less similar as geographic distance increases. Environmental variables such as elevation, pH, and dissolved oxygen strongly influence planktonic assemblages, with individual Difflugia species showing distinct associations with these gradients.

== Fossil history ==
The presence of a test in Difflugia allowed them to be extremely well-preserved in fossils. Difflugia are part of one of the oldest lineages of eukaryotes based on fossil records which date back 750Mya. The only structure of the organisms that was able to be preserved in the fossils was the test. Therefore, there have been issues differentiating genera such as Cryptodifflugia from Difflugia based on fossil record alone. Another problem arise from the distortion of test and changes to the xenosomes that makes genera difficult to identify from the testate amoebae fossil specimen alone.
