= Testate amoebae =

Group of amoebae with shells

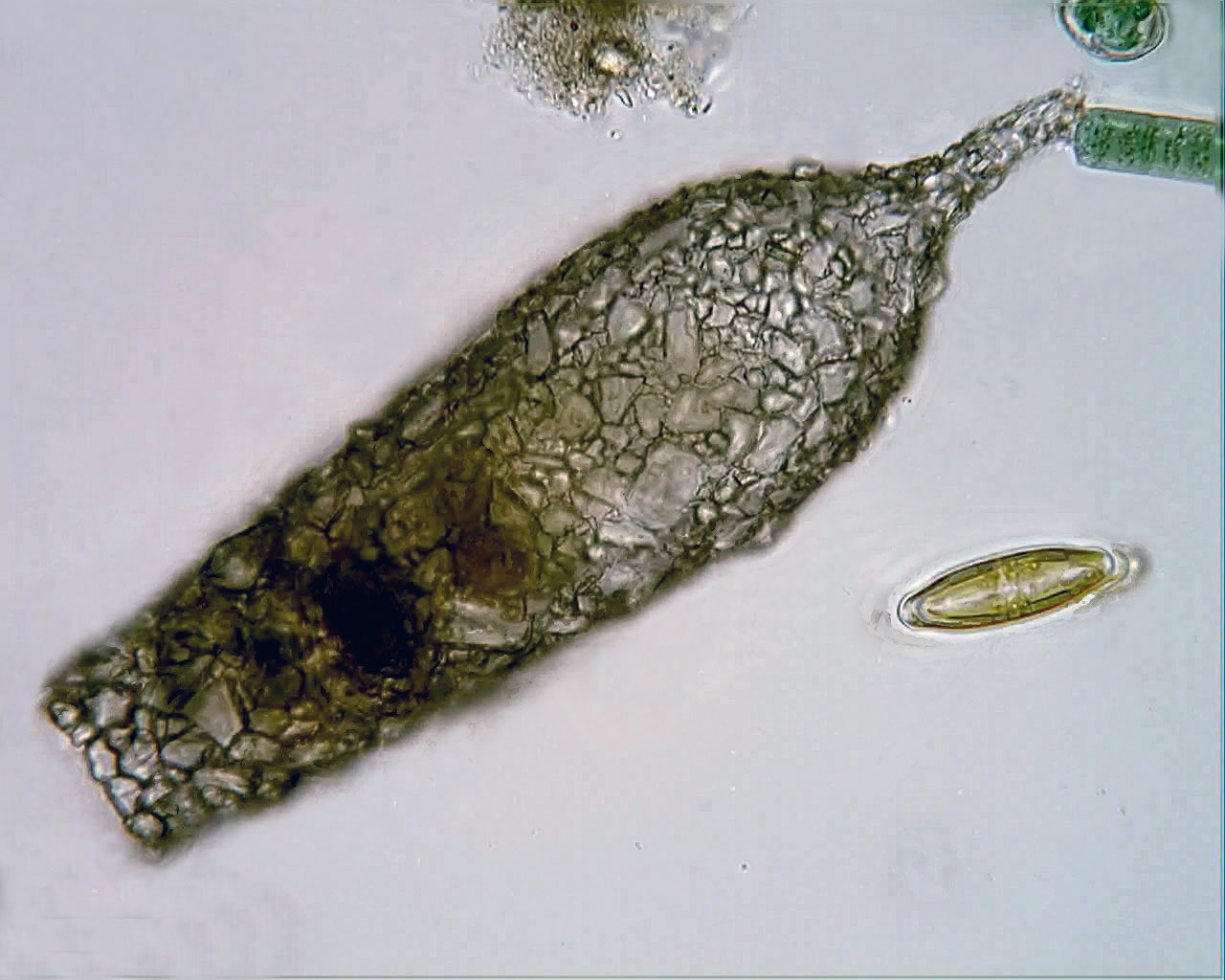
Shell of Cylindrifflugia acuminata: an agglutinated test made up of mineral particles glued together with secretions from within the cell (Autogenic Test)

Testate amoebae (formerly thecamoebians, Testacea or Thecamoeba) are a polyphyletic group of unicellular amoeboid protists, which differ from naked amoebae in the presence of a test that partially encloses the cell, with an aperture from which the pseudopodia emerge, that provides the amoeba with shelter from predators and environmental conditions.

The test of some species is produced entirely by the amoeba and may be organic, siliceous or calcareous depending on the species (autogenic tests), whereas in other cases the test is made up of particles of sediment collected by the amoeba which are then agglutinated together by secretions from within the cell (xenogenic tests). A few taxa (Hyalospheniidae) can build either type, depending on the circumstances and availability of foreign material.

The assemblage referred to as "testate amoebae" is actually composed of several, unrelated groups of organisms. However, some features they all share that have been used to group them together include the presence of a test (regardless of its composition) and pseudopodia that do not anastomose.

Testate amoebae can be found in most freshwater environments, including lakes, rivers, cenotes, as well as mires and soils.

The strong and resistant nature of the tests allows them to be preserved long after the amoeba has died. These characteristics, along with the sensitivity that some species display to changes in environmental conditions (such as temperature, pH, and conductivity), has sparked their use as bioindicators and paleoclimate proxies in recent years.

Possible fossils of testate amoebae have been found from the Gaoyuzhuang Formation, which is almost 1.6 billion years old. This would make them among the earliest known fossils of protists. Unusually, no other testate fossils are known until the Tonian, over 600 million years later.

== Gallery ==
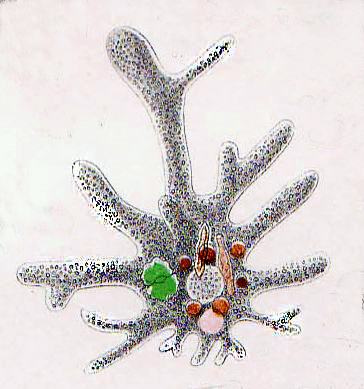
Naked amoeba (i. e. not testate) showing food vacuoles and ingested diatom

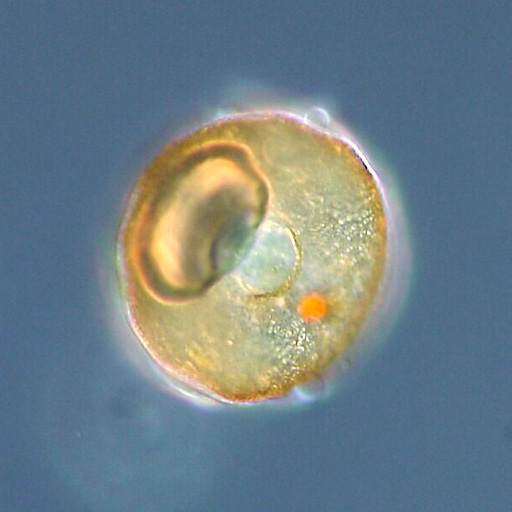
Shell or test of a testate amoeba, Arcella sp.

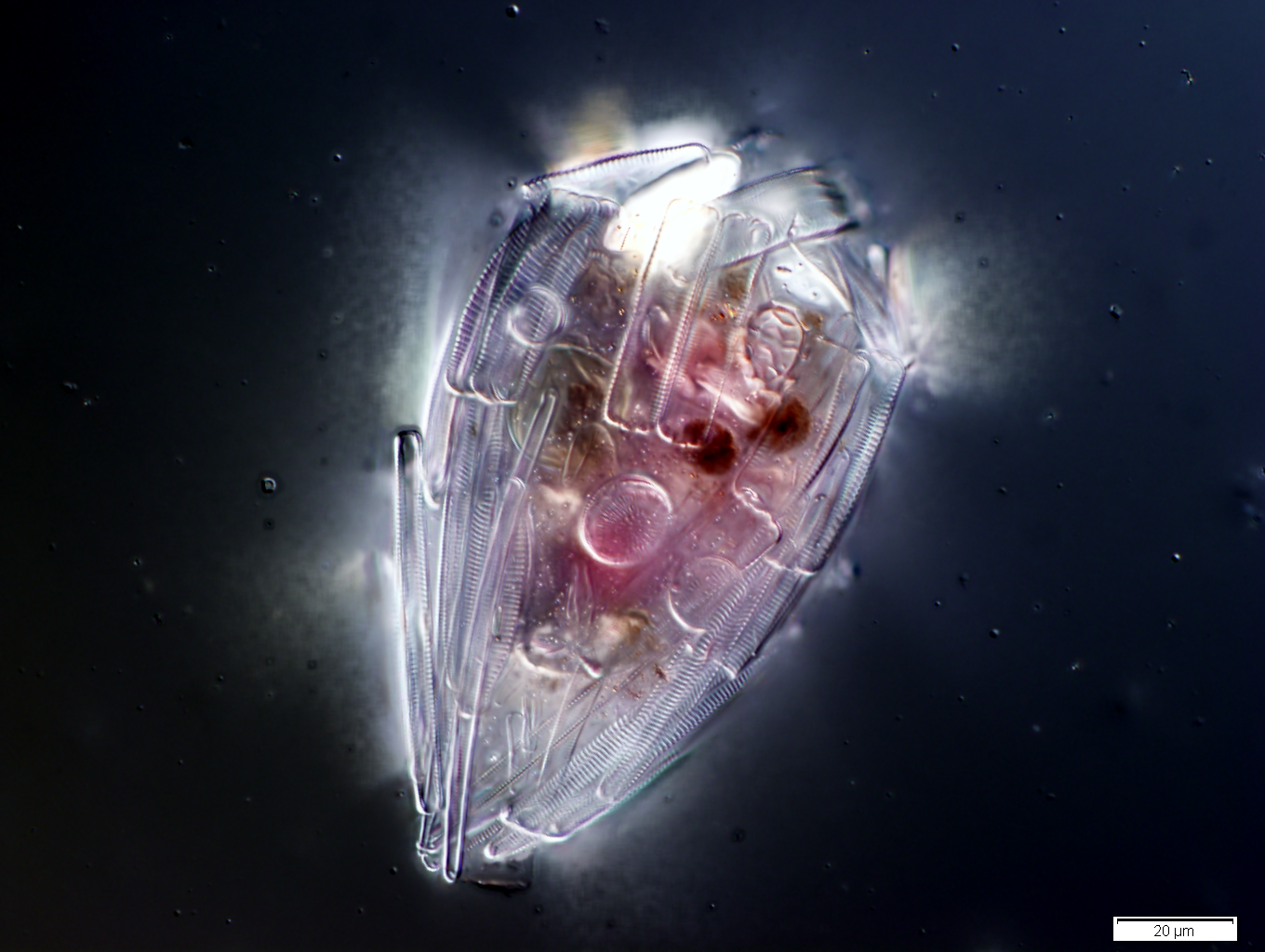
Xenogenic testate amoeba covered in diatoms (from Penard's Amoeba Collection)
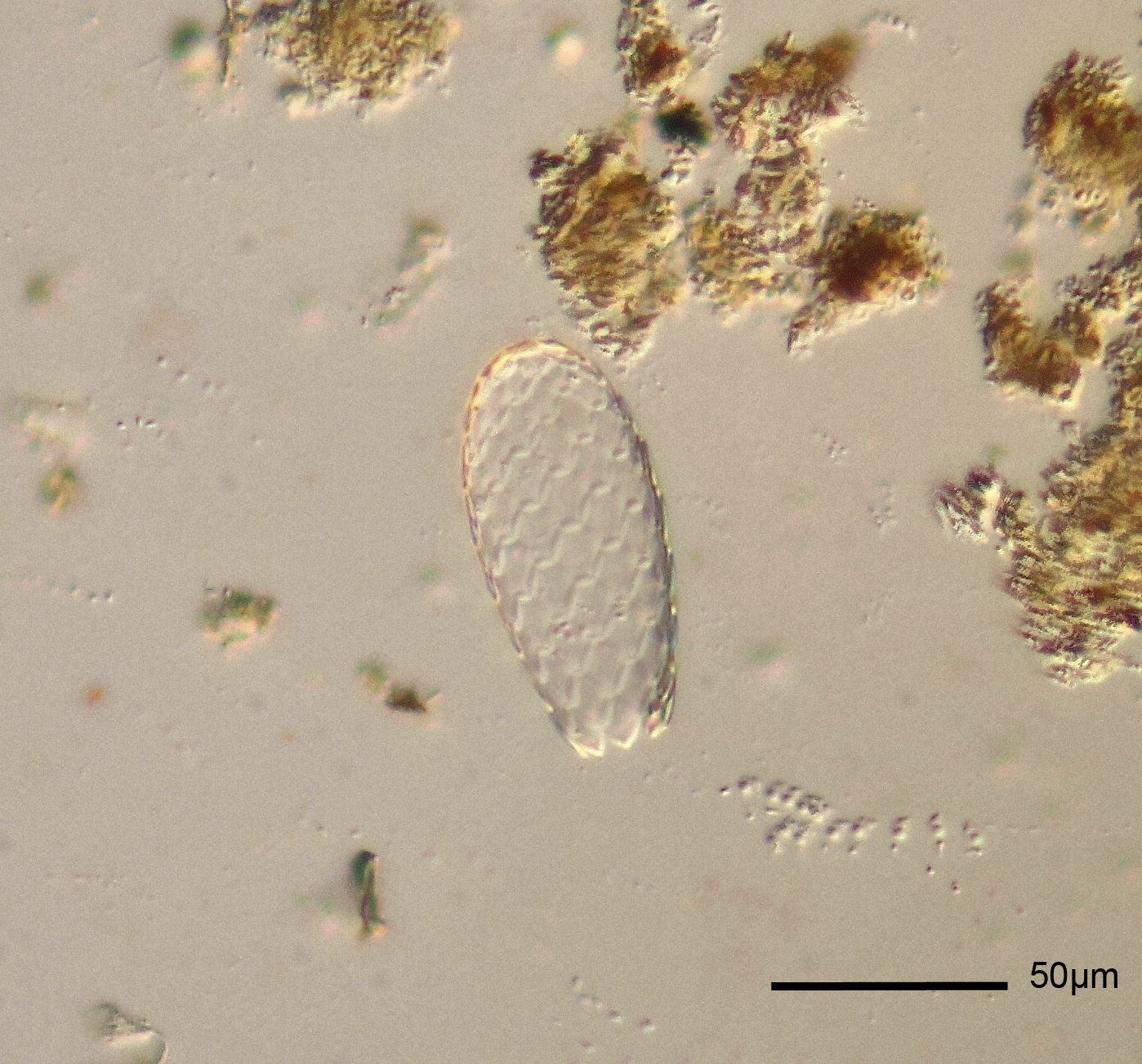
Euglypha tuberculata, a species with a siliceous autogenic test

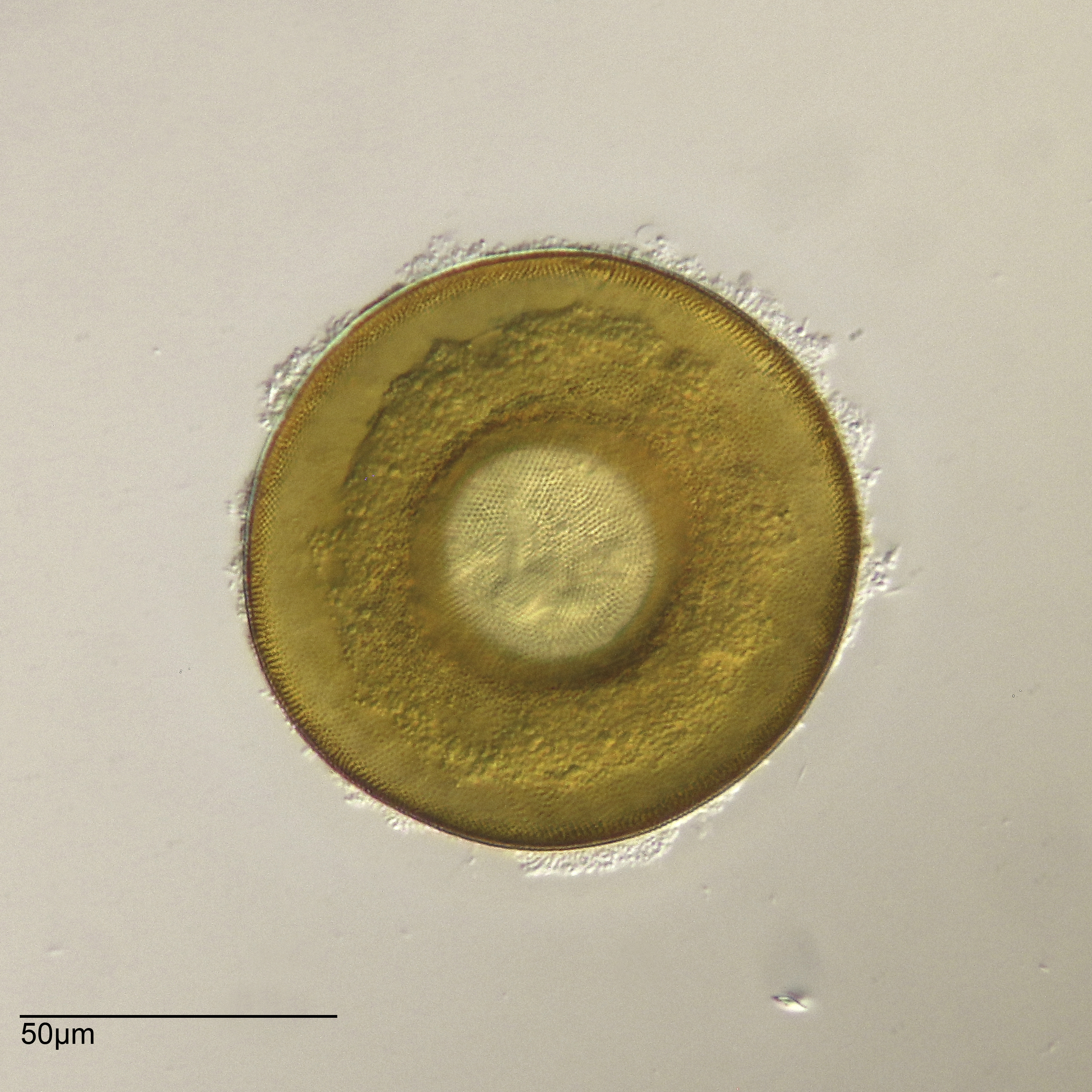
The autogenic test of Arcella discoides, made up of organic plates

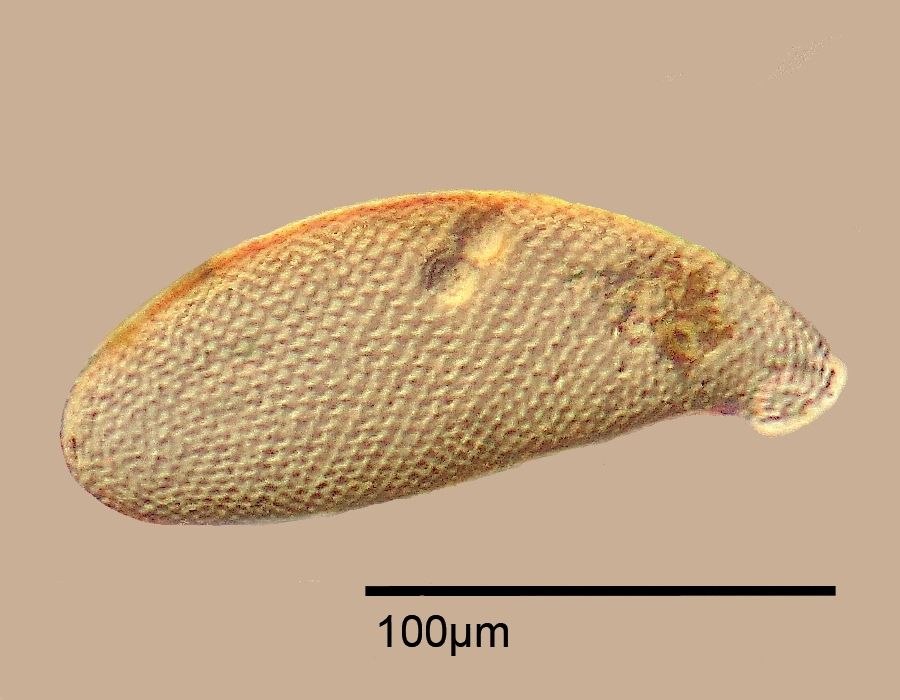
Shell of Cyphoderia ampulla, composed of circular, siliceous plates produced by the amoeba

== Taxonomy and classification ==
Testate amoebae are a polyphyletic assemblage. The main testate amoebae groups are the lobose Tubulinea, which include Arcellinida, Difflugina and Phryganellina (within the Amoebozoa), and the filose Euglyphida (within the SAR supergroup), although there are smaller groups that also include other testate amoebae.

=== Order Arcellinida ===
Family Arcellidae

- Arcella - Ehrenberg 1832
- Antarcella - Deflandre 1928

Family Netzeliidae

- Netzelia - Ogden 1979

Family Hyalospheniidae

- Quadrulella - Cockerell 1909
- Hyalosphenia - Stein 1859
- Alocodera - Jung 1942
- Apodera - Loeblich & Tappan 1961
- Certesella - Loeblich & Tappan 1961
- Porosia - Jung 1942
- Nebela - Leidy 1874
- Padaungiella - Lara & Todorov 2012

Family Microchlamyiidae

- Microchlamys - Cockerell 1911
- Spumochlamys - Kudryavtsev & Hausmann 2007

Family Plagiopyxidae

- Bullinularia - Deflandre 1953
- Geoplagiopyxis - Chardez 1961
- Protoplagiopyxis - Bonnet 1962
- Paracentropyxis - Bonnet 1960
- Plagiopyxis - Penard 1910
- Hoogenraadia - Gauthier-Lievre & Thomas 1958
- Planhoogenraadia - Bonnet 1977

Family Cryptodifflugiidae

- Cryptodifflugia - Penard 1890
- Wailesella - Deflandre 1928

Family Microcoryciidae

- Amphizonella - Greeff 1866
- Diplochlamys - Greeff 1888
- Microcorycia - Cockerell 1911
- Penardochlamys - Deflandre 1953
- Zonomyxa - Nusslin 1882
- Parmulina - Penard 1902

Family Phryganellidae

- Phryganella - Penard 1902

Family Lamtopyxidae

- Lamtopyxis - Bonnet 1974

Family Distomatopyxidae

- Distomatopyxis - Bonnet 1964

Family Paraquadrulidae

- Paraquadrula - Deflandre 1932
- Lamtoquadrula - Bonnet 1974

Family Centropyxidae

- Centropyxis - Stein 1857
- Proplagiopyxis - Schonborn 1964

Family Trigonopyxidae

- Trigonopyxis - Penard 1912
- Cyclopyxis - Deflandre 1929
- Geopyxella - Bonnet & Thomas 1955
- Cornuapyxis - Couteaux and Chardez 1981

Incertae sedis

- Argynnia - Vucetich 1974
- Awerintzewia - Schouteden 1906
- Cucurbitella - Penard 1902
- Difflugia - Leclerc 1815
- Geamphorella - Bonnet 1959
- Heleopera - Leidy 1879
- Jungia - Loeblich and Tappan 1961
- Lagenodifflugia - Medioli & Scott 1983
- Leptochlamys - West 1901
- Lesquereusia - Schlumberger 1845
- Maghrebia - Gauthier-Lievre & Thomas 1960
- Mediolus - Patterson 2014
- Microquadrula - Golemansky 1968
- Oopyxis - Jung 1942
- Pentagonia - Gauthier-Lievre & Thomas 1960
- Physochila - Jung 1942
- Pomoriella - Golemansky 1970
- Pontigulasia - Rhumbler 1896
- Protocucurbitella - Gauthier-Lievre & Thomas 1960
- Pseudawerintzewia - Bonnet 1959
- Pseudonebela - Gauthier-Lievre 1953
- Pyxidicula - Ehrenberg 1838
- Schoenbornia - Decloitre 1964
- Schwabia - Jung 1942
- Sexangularia - Awerintzew 1906
- Suiadifflugia - Green 1975
- Zivkovicia - Ogden 1987
- Ellipsopyxis - Bonnet 1965
- Ellipsopyxella - Bonnet 1975

=== Order Euglyphida ===
Family Euglyphidae

- Euglypha - Dujardin, 1841
- Scutiglypha - Foissner and Schiller, 2001

Family Trinematidae

- Trinema - Dujardin 1841
- Corythion - Taranek 1881
- Puytoracia - Bonnet, 1970
- Playfairina - Thomas 1961
- Pileolus - Coûteaux and Chardez 1962

Family Sphenoderiidae

- Sphenoderia - Schlumberger 1845
- Trachelocorythion - Bonnet 1979
- Deharvengia - Bonnet 1979

Family Assulinidae

- Assulina - Leidy 1879
- Placocista - Leidy 1879
- Valkanovia - Tappan 1966

Family Cyphoderiidae

- Cyphoderia - Schlumberger 1845
- Corythionella - Golemansky 1970
- Campascus - Leidy 1879
- Messemvriella - Golemansky 1973
- Pseudocorythion - Valkanov 1970
- Schaudinnula - Awerintzev 1907

Family Paulinellidae

- Paulinella - Lauterborn 1895
- Ovulinata - Anderson, Rogerson & Hannah 1996
- Micropyxidiella - Tarnawski & Lara 2015

Incertae sedis

- Pareuglypha - Penard 1902
- Ampullataria - Van Oye 1956
- Euglyphidion - Bonnet 1960
- Heteroglypha - Thomas and Gauthier-Lièvre 1959
- Tracheleuglypha - Deflandre 1928

=== Other Cercozoa ===
Family Chlamydophryidae

- Capsellina - Penard 1909
- Lecythium - Hertwig and Lesser 1876
- Rhogostoma - Belar 1921
- Rhizaspis - Skuja 1948
- Chlamydophrys - Cienkowsky 1876
- Clypeolina - Cienkowsky 1877
- Penardeugenia - Deflandre 1953
- Leptochlamydophrys - Belar 1921
- Diaphoropodon - Archer 1869

Family Pseudodifflugiidae

- Pseudodifflugia - Schlumberger 1845

Family Psammonobiotidae

- Alepiella - Golemansky 1970
- Centropyxiella - Valkanov 1970
- Chardezia - Golemansky 1970
- Edaphonobiotus - Schönborn, Foissner & Meisterfeld 1983
- Micramphora - Valkanov 1970
- Micropsammella - Golemansky 1970
- Nadinella - Penard 1902
- Ogdeniella - Golemanski 1982
- Psammonobiotus - Golemansky 1970
- Propsammonobiotus - Golemansky 1991

Incertae sedis

- Feuerbornia - Jung, 1942
- Frenzelina - Penard 1902
- Lesquerella - Chardez and Thomas, 1980
- Matsakision - Bonnet, 1967
- Rhumbleriella - Golemansky 1970

=== Order Stramenopila ===
Family Amphitremidae

- Amphitrema - Archer 1869
- Archerella - Loeblich and Tappan, 1961

Family Diplophryidae

- Diplophrys - Barker 1868

Family Amphifilidae

- Amphifila - Anderson and Cavalier-Smith 2012

Family Sorodiplophryidae

- Sorodiplophris - Dykstra and Olive 1975

=== Unclassified testate amoebae ===
- Paramphitrema - Valkanov 1970

The following table includes a few examples of testate amoebae genera, and reflects their position within the classification by Adl et al. (2012), where five supergroups (Amoebozoa, Opisthokonta, Excavata, SAR and Archaeplastida) were proposed to classify all eukaryotes. This classification purposefully avoids the use of Linnaean higher category names (phylum, class, order, family). While it has been noted that the names that Adl et al. provide for the clades may result confusing or uninformative regarding the relative degree of phenotypic distinctiveness amongst groups when used in isolation, this system avoids creating superfluous ranks where unnecessary and provides stable group names that can be retained even when a group is moved to a different lineage, as is often the case with protists, as their classification remains in constant review.

Amoebozoa	Tubulinea	Arcellinida	Arcellina	Amphizonella - Arcella - Microchlamys - Microcorycia - Spumochlamys			
Amoebozoa	Tubulinea	Arcellinida	Difflugina	Bullinularia - Centropyxis - Difflugia - Distomatopyxis - Heleopera - Hyalosphenia - Lesquereusia - Nebela - Paraquadrula - Pontigulasia - Plagiopyxis - Quadrulella - Trigonopyxis			
Amoebozoa	Tubulinea	Arcellinida	Phryganellina	Cryptodifflugia - Phryganella - Wailesella			
Amoebozoa	Discosea	Himatismenida	Cochliopodium				
SAR Supergroup	Stramenopila	Labyrinthulomycetes	Amphitremida	Amphitrema - Archerella			
SAR Supergroup	Rhizaria	Cercozoa	Thecofilosea	Cryomonadida	Rhizaspididae	Capsellina - Rhizaspis - Rhogostoma	
SAR Supergroup	Rhizaria	Cercozoa	Thecofilosea	Cryomonadida	Ventricleftida	Ventrifissura - Verrucomonas	
SAR Supergroup	Rhizaria	Cercozoa	Imbricatea	Silicofilosea	Euglyphida	Euglyphidae	Euglypha - Scutiglypha
SAR Supergroup	Rhizaria	Cercozoa	Imbricatea	Silicofilosea	Euglyphida	Assulinidae	Assulina - Placocista - Valkanovia
SAR Supergroup	Rhizaria	Cercozoa	Imbricatea	Silicofilosea	Euglyphida	Trinematidae	Corythion - Playfairina - Puytoracia - Trinema
SAR Supergroup	Rhizaria	Cercozoa	Imbricatea	Silicofilosea	Euglyphida	Cyphoderidae	Campascus - Corythionella - Cyphoderia - Messemvriella - Pseudocorythion - Schaudinnula.
SAR Supergroup	Rhizaria	Cercozoa	Imbricatea	Silicofilosea	Euglyphida	Paulinellidae	Ovulinata - Paulinella

Traditionally, those species that form large networks of anastomosing pseudopodia, despite some of them having tests, are not counted amongst testate amoebae; this comprises genus Gromia and the Foraminifera (both in Rhizaria).

== Notes ==
The Thecamoebida (Amoebozoa), with the genus Thecamoeba, despite their name, do not have tests.

Euglyphid testate amoebae are closely related to the Foraminifera.

== Bibliography ==
- Medioli, F.S.; Scott, D.B.; Collins, E.; Asioli, S.; Reinhardt, E.G. (1999). The thecamoebian bibliography. Palaeontologia Electronica, 3: 1-161, .
- Medioli, F.S.; Bonnet, L.; Scott, D.B.; Medioli, B.E. (2003). The thecamoebian bibliography: 2nd edition. Palaeontologia Electronica, 61: 1-107, .
