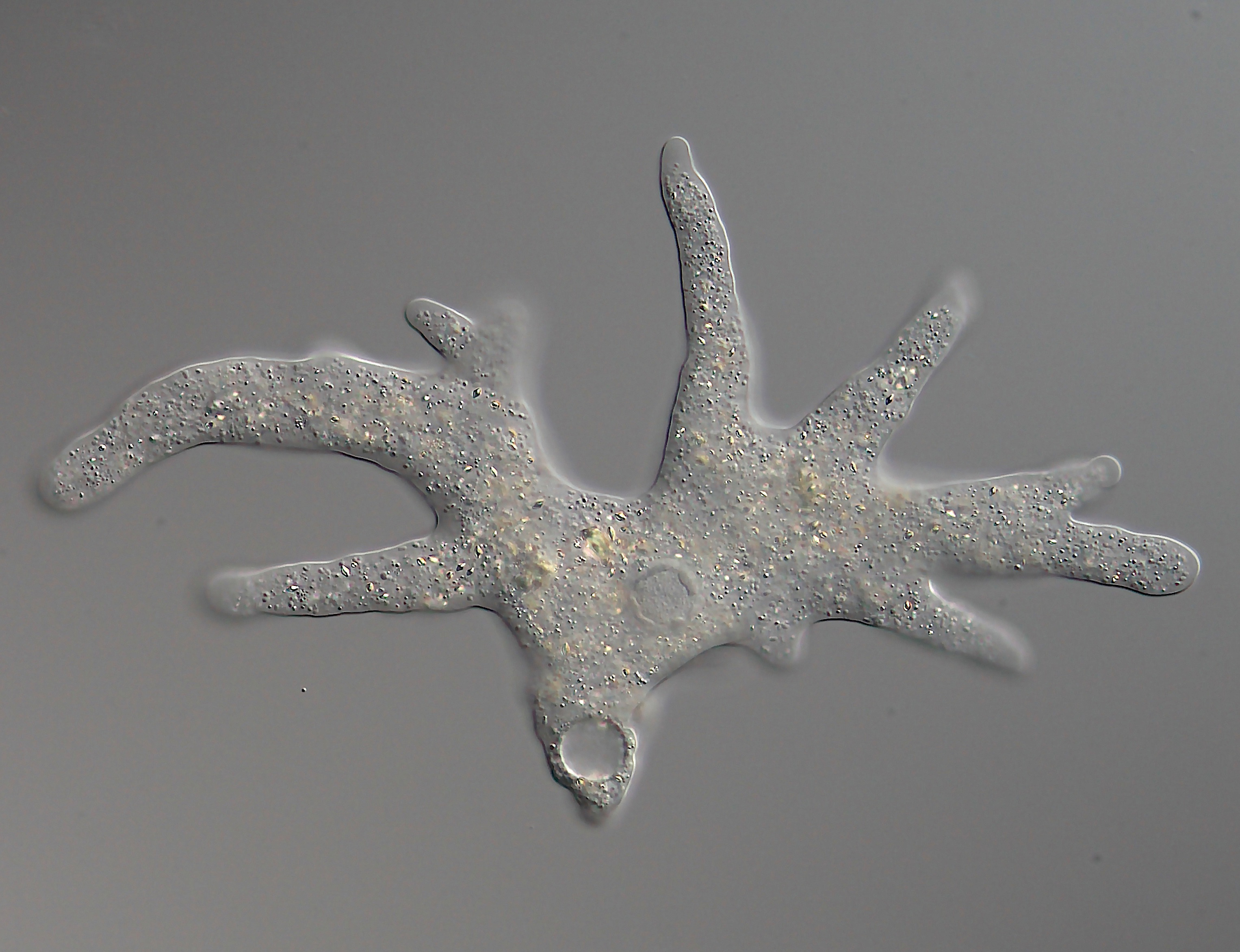
- Amoeba proteus

Scientific classification
- Domain: Eukaryota
- Phylum: Amoebozoa
- Subphylum: Lobosa
- Class: Tubulinea; Smirnov et al. 2005

Subclasses and orders
- Corycidia; Trichosida; Echinamoebia; Echinamoebida; Elardia; Leptomyxida; Euamoebida; Arcellinida

= Tubulinea =

Class of protozoans

The Tubulinea are a major grouping of Amoebozoa, including most of the more familiar amoebae genera like Amoeba, Arcella, Difflugia and Hartmannella.

== Characteristics ==
During locomotion most Tubulinea have a roughly cylindrical form or produce numerous cylindrical pseudopods. Each cylinder advances by a single central stream of cytoplasm, granular in appearance, and has no subpseudopodia. This distinguishes them from other amoeboid groups, although in some members this is not the normal type of locomotion.

Representation of a tubulinid: 1. Ectoplasm; 2. Endoplasm; 3. Lobopodia, a pseudopod or arm-like projection made of cytoplasm; 4. Phagocytic vacuole; 5. Mitochondrion, creates ATP (energy) for the cell (branched cristae); 6. Endosymbiotic bacterium; 7. Triuret (nitrogen waste) crystal; 8. Prey; 9. Nucleus; 10. Honeycomb lamina; 11. Nucleolus; 12. Endoplasmic reticulum, the transport network for molecules going to specific parts of the cell; 13. Golgi apparatus, modifies proteins and sends them out of the cell; 14. Lysosome, holds enzymes; 15. Digestive vacuole; 16. Lipid granule; 17. Vesicle; 18. Contractile vacuole, regulates the quantity of water inside a cell; 19. Uroid

== Classification ==
This class was anticipated by some biologists such as Jahn, who grouped all amoebae with granular pseudopodia together, but most split the lobose amoebae into testate Testacealobosia and naked Gymnamoebia. These latter are polyphyletic, but molecular trees by Bolivar et al. identified a core monophyletic subgroup. Subsequent studies showed the testate lobose amoebae belong to the same group, which was thus renamed Lobosea sensu stricto or Tubulinea.

=== Taxonomy ===
The class Tubulinea, as of 2022, is classified into three major groups: Corycida, Echinamoebida and Elardia. The most taxonomically abundant group is Elardia, which contains the testate amoebae of Arcellinida and the naked amoebae of orders Leptomyxida and Euamoebida.

- Corycidia Kang et al. 2017
  - Family Microcoryciidae de Saedeleer 1934
  - Order Trichosida Moebius 1889
    - Family Trichosphaeriidae Sheehan & Banner 1973
- Order Echinamoebida Cavalier-Smith 2004 em. 2011
  - Family Vermamoebidae Cavalier-Smith & Smirnov 2011
  - Family Echinamoebidae Page 1975
- Elardia Kang et al. 2017
  - Order Leptomyxida Pussard & Pons 1976 em. Page 1987
    - Family Flabellulidae Bovee & Jahn, 1967 ex Bovee 1970
    - Family Gephyramoebidae Pussard & Pons 1976
    - Family Leptomyxidae Goodey 1915
    - Family Rhizamoebidae Smirnov et al. 2016
  - Superorder Eulobosia Cavalier-Smith 2016
    - Order Euamoebida Lepşi 1960 em. Cavalier-Smith 2016
      - Family Nolandellidae Cavalier-Smith 2011
      - Family Hartmannellidae Singh 1951 em. Smirnov et al. 2011
      - Family Amoebidae (Ehrenberg 1838) Page 1987
    - Order Arcellinida Kent 1880
      - Suborder Phryganellina Bovee 1985
        - Family Phryganellidae Jung 1942
        - Family Cryptodifflugiidae Jung 1942
      - Suborder Organoconcha Kosakyan et al. 2016
        - Family Microchlamyiidae Ogden 1985
      - Suborder Glutinoconcha Kosakyan et al. 2016
        - Infraorder Volnustoma Kosakyan et al. 2016
          - Family Heleoperidae Jung 1942
        - Infraorder Hyalospheniformes Lahr et al. 2019
          - Family Hyalospheniidae Schultze 1877 emend. Kosakyan & Lara 2012 [Nebelidae Taranek 1882]
        - Infraorder Excentrostoma Lahr et al. 2019
          - Family Centropyxidae Jung 1942 [incl. Plagiopyxidae]
        - Infraorder Cylindrothecina González-Miguéns, Todorov, Blandenier, Porfirio-Sousa, Ribeiro, Ramos, Lahr & Lara 2022
          - Family Cylindrifflugiidae González-Miguéns, Todorov, Blandenier, Porfirio-Sousa, Ribeiro, Ramos, Lahr & Lara 2022
        - Infraorder Longithecina Kosakyan et al. 2016
          - Family Lesquereusiidae [Paraquadrulidae Deflandre 1953]
          - Family Difflugiidae Wallich 1864
        - Infraorder Sphaerothecina Kosakyan et al. 2016
          - Family Netzeliidae Kosakyan et al. 2016 [Cyclopyxidae Schönborn 1989]
          - Family Arcellidae Ehrenberg 1832
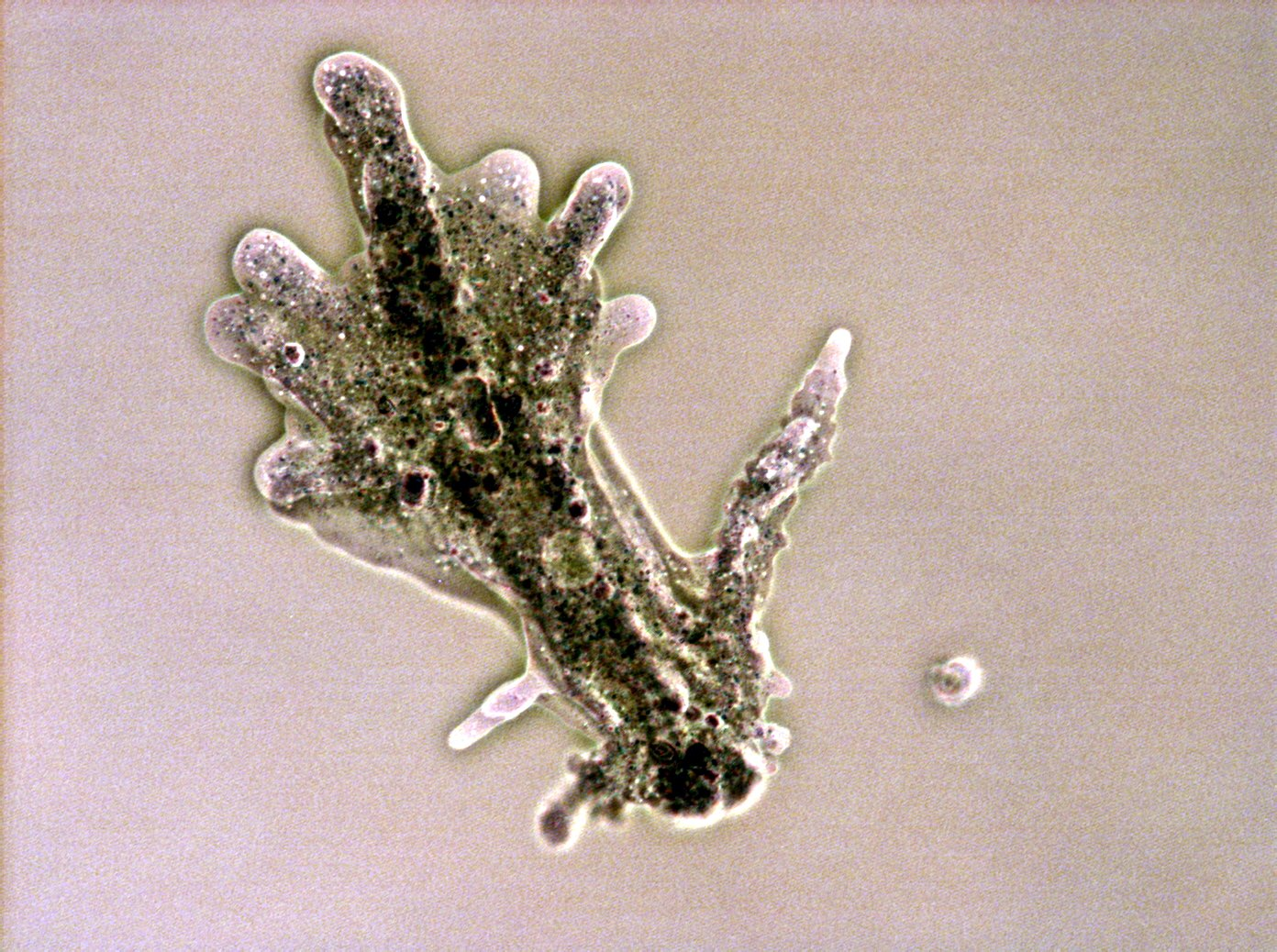
Amoeba proteus

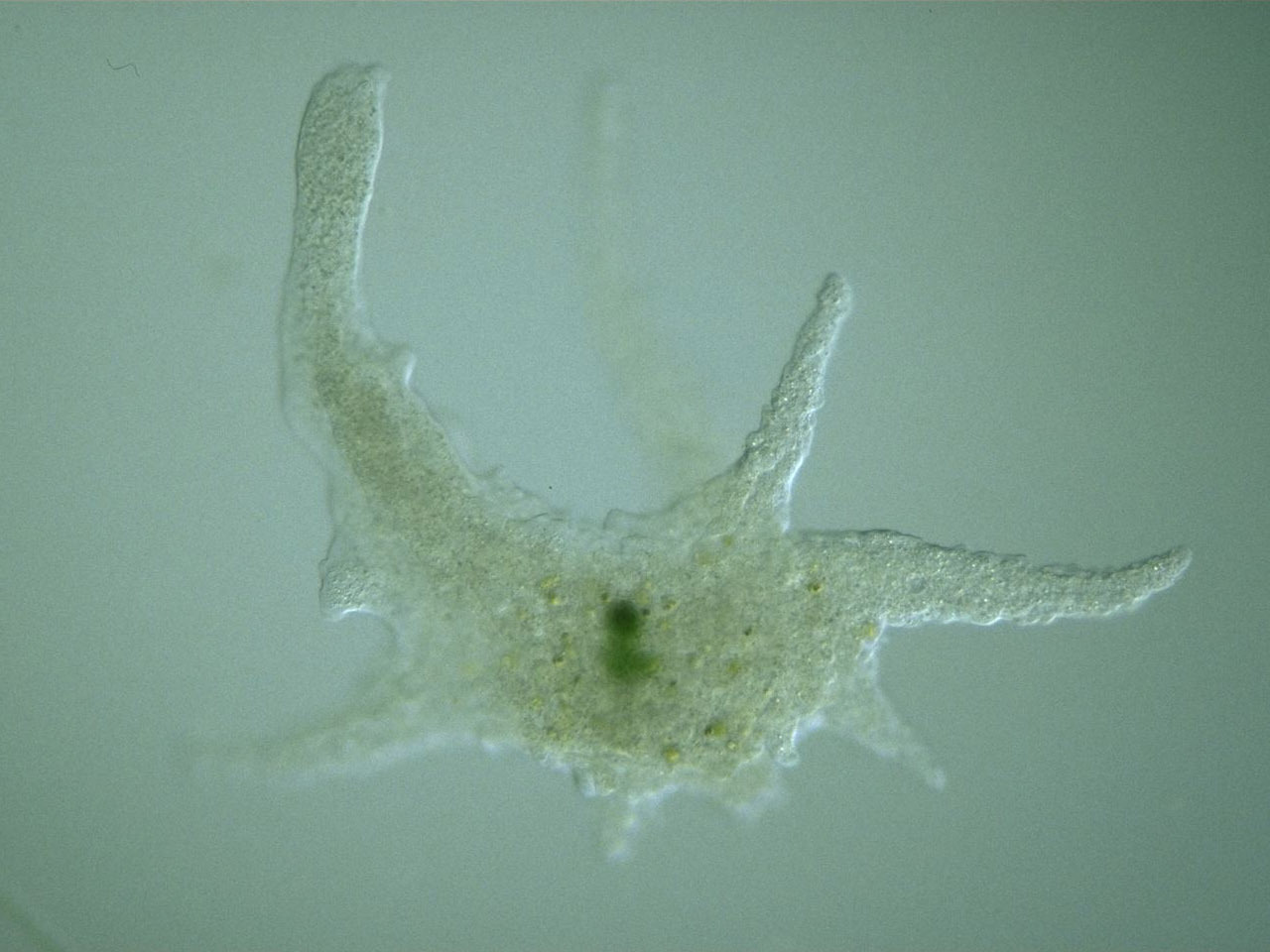
Chaos sp.

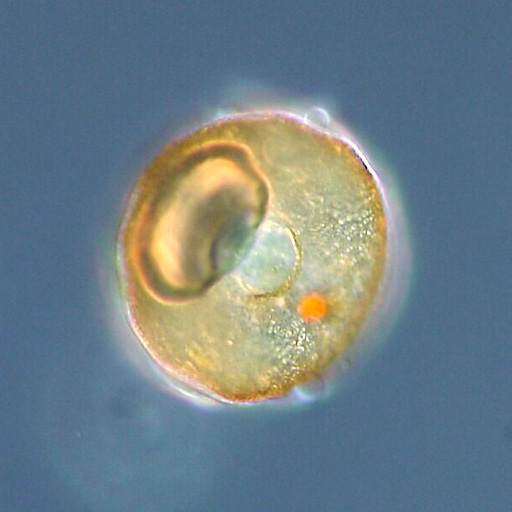
Arcella sp. test

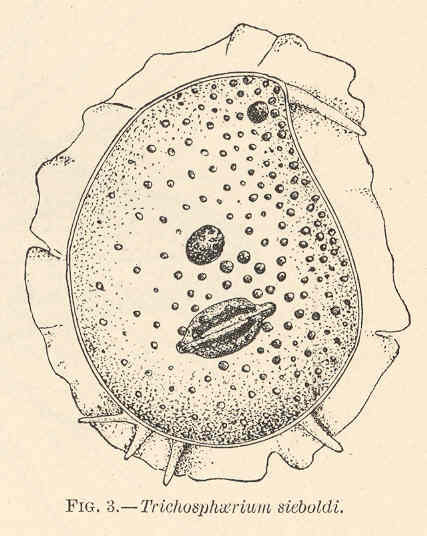
Trichosphaerium sieboldi
