= Aldona (fungus) =

Scientific classification
- Kingdom: Fungi
- Division: Ascomycota
- Class: Dothideomycetes
- Order: Asterinales
- Family: Parmulariaceae
- Genus: Aldona; Racib.

Type species
- Aldona stella-nigra Racib.

Genus of fungi

Aldona is a genus of fungi in the family Parmulariaceae.

The genus was circumscribed by Marjan Raciborski in Parasit. Algen Pilze Java's vol.1 on page 19 in 1900.

The genus name of Aldona is in honour of Aldona of Lithuania (c. 1309–1339), who was Queen consort of Poland (1333–1339), and a princess of the Grand Duchy of Lithuania. She was the daughter of Gediminas, Grand Duke of Lithuania.

== Species ==
As accepted by Species Fungorum;

- Aldona americana Petr. & Cif. (1932)
- Aldona minima E. Müll. & B.V. Patil (1973)
- Aldona stella-nigra Racib. (1900)
- Aldonata pterocarpi Sivan. & A.R.P. Sinha (1989)
