= Pachypatella =

Scientific classification
- Kingdom: Fungi
- Division: Ascomycota
- Class: Dothideomycetes
- Order: Asterinales
- Family: Parmulariaceae
- Genus: Pachypatella; Theiss. & Syd. (1915)

Type species
- Pachypatella alsophilae (Racib.) Theiss. & Syd. (1915)

Species
- P. alsophilae P. petrakii

Genus of fungi

Pachypatella is a genus of fungi in the family Parmulariaceae.
