= Coccodothis =

Scientific classification
- Kingdom: Fungi
- Division: Ascomycota
- Class: Dothideomycetes
- Order: Asterinales
- Family: Parmulariaceae
- Genus: Coccodothis; Theiss. & Syd.

Type species
- Coccodothis sphaeroidea (Cooke) Theiss. & Syd.

Genus of fungi

Coccodothis is a genus of fungi in the family Parmulariaceae.
