= Palawania =

Scientific classification
- Kingdom: Fungi
- Division: Ascomycota
- Class: Dothideomycetes
- Order: Asterinales
- Family: Parmulariaceae
- Genus: Palawania; Syd. & P. Syd.

Type species
- Palawania grandis (Niessl) Syd. & P. Syd.

Genus of fungi

Palawania is a genus of fungi in the Parmulariaceae family.

== Species ==
As accepted by Species Fungorum;

- Palawania cocoes Syd. & P. Syd. (1914)
- Palawania grandis (Niessl) Syd. & P. Syd. (1914)
- Palawania thailandensis Mapook & K.D. Hyde (2016)

Former species; (all Parmulariaceae family)

- P. brosimi Bat. & J.L. Bezerra (1960) = Palawaniella brosimi
- P. dovyalidis (Doidge) G.C. Nel (1942) = Inocyclus dovyalidis
- P. eucleae (Doidge) G.C. Nel (1942) = Palawaniella orbiculata
- P. halleriae (Dippen.) Doidge (1948) = Palawaniella halleriae
- P. orbiculata (Syd. & P. Syd.) Doidge (1948) = Palawaniella orbiculata
