= Protothyrium =

Scientific classification
- Kingdom: Fungi
- Division: Ascomycota
- Class: Dothideomycetes
- Order: Asterinales
- Family: Parmulariaceae
- Genus: Protothyrium; G. Arnaud

Type species
- Protothyrium salvadorae (Cooke) G. Arnaud

Species
- P. borneense P. salvadorae P. tricalysiae P. trichiliae

Genus of fungi

Protothyrium is a genus of fungi in the family Parmulariaceae.
