= Parmulariopsella =

Scientific classification
- Kingdom: Fungi
- Division: Ascomycota
- Class: Dothideomycetes
- Order: Asterinales
- Family: Parmulariaceae
- Genus: Parmulariopsella; Sivan.

Type species
- Parmulariopsella burseracearum Sivan.

Genus of fungi

Parmulariopsella is a genus of fungi in the family Parmulariaceae. A monotypic genus, it contains the single species Parmulariopsella burseracearum.
