= Roberta Kuʻulei Keakealani =

Hawaiian educator (born 1971)

Roberta Kuʻulei Keakealani (born 1971) is an educator, cultural practitioner, poet, storyteller, and activist from a paniolo family from Puʻuanahulu, North Kona, Hawaii. She was a director of Ahahui O Puʻu Waʻawaʻa, a member of the Puʻu Waʻawaʻa Advisory Council in consultation with the Department of Land and Natural Resources, and the president of Hui ʻOhana Mai Puʻu Anahulu A Me Puʻu Waʻawaʻa. Keakealani is the cultural and educational director of Hui Aloha Kīholo and the Director of Ka Pilina Poina ʻOle which are heavily involved in restoration and conservation work in Kona. She is also the Native Hawaiian Community Representative Director at the Kaʻūpūlehu Foundation. She was involved with the creation of the Hawaiian language immersion preschool Pūnana Leo o Waimea and the early childhood program Mālamapōki'i. She wrote RK Branding Day and articles in Ke Ola Magazine, and directed the short films The Paniolo Way, Last of the Hawaiian Cowboys, and Ka Nohona Makamae o nā Paniolo: The Treasured Lifestyle of the Paniolo.

== Background ==
Keakealani was born in 1971 and raised in Puʻu Anahulu in North Kona, Hawai`i to a family of paniolo, or Hawaiian Cowboys. Puʻu Anahulu, Puʻu Waʻawaʻa, and Kaʻuluʻpūlehu are her homelands, and Waimea and Puʻu Anahulu are her ancestral lands. Keakealani's grandfather was a paniolo on Puʻu Waʻawaʻa Ranch for more that 65 years. Sonny Keakealani Jr., her father, was also a paniolo on Puʻu Waʻawaʻa Ranch, and Kuʻulei would spend time there with him. In addition, Sonny Keakealani was a paniolo on Parker Ranch in Waimea. Kuʻulei would divide her time between Waimea and being with her grandparents in Pu'u Anahulu. Her family has resided in North Kona since at least the mid-1800s. Keakealani's mother is of Northern Cree decent. Keakealani has three daughters, and she has made it her responsibility to ensure that the history of her ancestors is remembered and that Hawaiian culture is preserved for future generations.

== Contribution to Hawaiian Natural History ==
=== Puʻu Waʻawaʻa land management ===
Keakealani is an activist. She was a director of the nonprofit group Ahahui o Puʻu Waʻawaʻa, the president of Hui ʻOhana Mai Puʻu Anahulu A Me Puʻu Waʻawaʻa (Hui ʻOhana), and a member of the Puʻu Waʻawaʻa Advisory Council (PAC) in consultation with the Department of Land and Natural Resources (DLNR).

In 2001, Ahahui o Pu'u Wa'awa'a petitioned to the Board of Land and Natural Resources that the state-owned North Kona Puʻu Waʻawaʻa land lease be transferred to the group upon the lease's expiration. Keakealani was a director of the group. The group's proposal to the Board focused on the management of Hawaiian heritage, ranching, hunting, conservation of endangered species, and ecotourism associated with the land, giving Hawaiian and non-Hawaiians the opportunity to contribute ideas to how the land is managed.

Hunters of the Wildlife Conservation Association of Hawaii had a competing petition: although they proposed environmental protection, they also wanted sustained hunting without eradication of animals. They did not consider ecotourism. Ranchers, the current lease holders, also petitioned to hold onto the lease; they needed 1000 cattle to make a profit from their business. These proposals differed from that of the Ahahui, which emphasized eradication of animals in certain areas while maintaining sustained hunting in others. The Ahahui also wanted to control fire and non-native grass with 500 cattle.

In 2002, management of land in the Puʻu Waʻawaʻa and Puʻu Anahulu ahupuaʻa was transferred from the Land Division to the Division of Forestry and Wildlife and State Parks, by the Board of Land and Natural Resources. The Puʻu Waʻawaʻa Advisory Council (PAC) was created so that DLNR could consult the group while drawing up a management plan for Puʻu Waʻawaʻa. PAC was composed of community members knowledgeable in the contents of the plan, and Keakealani was a member of PAC. The plan was created with the intent to protect Pu'u Wa'awa'a and Pu'u Anahulu's cultural, natural, and recreational resources now and for the future, to restore native ecosystems and endangered species, to preserve archeological and cultural resources, and to manage hunting, livestock grazing, ecotourism, trails, public access, environmental education, reforestation, and fire control. The plan would follow the traditional ahupua'a model, and it incorporated a proposal from Ahahui o Pu'u Wa'awa'a.

Keakealani was also the president of Hui ʻOhana Mai Puʻu Anahulu A Me Puʻu Waʻawaʻa, a community group made up of Hawaiians whose ancestors had been in the Puʻu Waʻawaʻa and Puʻu Anahulu areas since before the 1840s. Hui ʻOhana could help implement the management plan.

=== Kīholo loko'ia restoration ===
Keakealani is the education and cultural director of Hui Aloha Kīholo.

In 1859, an eruption of Mauna Loa began in the evening of January 23. By March 7, the lava flow eventually entered the sea south of Wainanali`i at Kiholo, destroying a coastal village on the way and loko'ia in Wainanali`i and Kiholo, on the west coast of the island. The lava flow had destroyed most of Kīholo village and reduced the fishpond from 600 acres to a mere 3.2 acres. In 1980, Paul Mitchell purchased 7 acres of land on Kīholo Bay. This land was later donated to the Nature Conservancy by Paul's son, Angus Mitchell in 2011.

Restoration work of the Kīholo loko'ia was a joint effort between the Nature Conservancy and Hui Aloha Kīholo. As the director of Hui Aloha Kīholo, Roberta Ku`ulei Keakealani was personally involved in its restoration work. The two organizations have led monthly volunteer workdays since 2013. Since then, volunteers have restored 1,300 feet of rock walls surrounding the fishpond, cleared non-native ironwood and kiawe trees from the pond, planted native pohuehue vines and 'ae'ae, and fenced off feral goats from entering the restored areas.

Hui Aloha Kīholo has also hosted educational events for the public at Kīholo. These events teach traditional practices and ancestral knowledge of the place. Keakealani believes that passing on this knowledge to today's youth will prepare them to take care of the land in the future. "The transfer of place-based, traditional knowledge from generation to generation is vital for preparing future stewards," (Roberta Ku`ulei Keakealani)

=== Kaʻūpūlehu Forest conservation and protection ===
Keakealani is the Native Hawaiian Community Representative Director at the Kaʻūpūlehu Foundation, a non-profit focused on protecting and managing cultural resources in the Kaʻūpūlehu ahupuaʻa.

The Office of Hawaiian Affairs (OHA) awarded Hawaiʻi Forest Institute $172,262 over two years for the purpose of preservation of the native dryland lama forest of Kaʻūpūlehu. The mission of the Kaʻūpūlehu conservation project is "for people to feel connected and committed to perpetuating a functioning native landscape, its genealogical stories and multiple truths, and treating each other with kindness and respect. The vision for Kaʻūpūlehu is to become a healthy landscape of plenty, alive with native plants, bird song and history that will be tended and cherished by many." Kaʻūpūlehu is located in Kekaha, Hawai`i.

Ku'ulei is also the Director of Ka Pilina Poina ʻOle. The group is dedicated to the perpetuation of homeland knowledge of the Kekaha Region of North Kona, and it focuses on educating the public through the sharing of oral traditions. Ka Pilina Poina ʻOle works closely with the groups Hoʻōla ka Makanaʻā and Hoʻohele Mea Lāʻau. Each group provides curriculum that teaches the ecology of native ecosystems and integrates ideas of culture, mālama, kuleana, and creative thinking. Ka Pilina Poina ʻOle focuses on the history of Kaʻūpūlehu and its native inhabitants both past and present. They emphasize efforts to foster a responsibility between oneself, one's family, one's community and one's homeland.

=== Cultural education ===
Since the early 1990s, cultural education has been an area of focus for Keakealani. She taught for 12 years in the classroom. She helped open the Hawaiian language immersion preschool Pūnana Leo o Waimea, as well as Mālamapōki'i, an early childhood Program of Kanu o Ka 'Āina New Century Public Charter School. She created programs with cultural influence when she worked for Nā Pua Noʻeau Center for Gifted and Talented Native Hawaii Children under the University of Hawaii, which were used in three of the six districts of Hawaiʻi Island.

=== Published work ===
Keakealani is a storyteller and poet. Keakealani wrote the book RK Branding Day to honor Robert Keakealani, her grandfather and the patriarch of her family, and the paniolo way of life. She wrote the following articles in Ke Ola Magazine: Who Am I?, The Morning Message, Lessons in the Land: Connecting with the 'Dryland Kine' Kūpuna, Cultivators, Legacy, Healthy Boundaries, Aloha ʻĀina: Waimea I Uka, and Each Place Has Voice of Its Own.

Keakealani was a producer and director of the short films The Paniolo Way, Last of the Hawaiian Cowboys, and Ka Nohona Makamae o nā Paniolo: The Treasured Lifestyle of the Paniolo. The Paniolo Way is about paniolo families with connections to Parker Ranch. Last of the Hawaiian Cowboys focuses on the life story of Sonny Keakealani, Kuʻulei's father and retired Parker Ranch paniolo. He shared his story so that younger people might follow his example and perpetuate the paniolo way of life. In Ka Nohona Makamae o nā Paniolo: The Treasured Lifestyle of the Paniolo, Hawaiian cowboys were asked the question "what does your saddle mean to you?." The films communicate that paniolo families, who love the lifestyle and who persevere through difficulties, help preserve Hawaiian cowboy heritage. The paniolo's respect for the land, culture, and people is also evident in the films. The films were meant to increase interest in younger generations, in order to preserve the paniolo way of life.
