= Perischizon =

Scientific classification
- Kingdom: Fungi
- Division: Ascomycota
- Class: Dothideomycetes
- Order: Asterinales
- Family: Parmulariaceae
- Genus: Perischizon; P. Syd.

Type species
- Perischizon oleifolium (Kalchbr. & Cooke) Syd. & P. Syd.

Species
- P. bewsii P. brasiliense P. oleifolium

Genus of fungi

Perischizon is a genus of fungi in the family Parmulariaceae.
