= Cycloschizon =

Scientific classification
- Kingdom: Fungi
- Division: Ascomycota
- Class: Dothideomycetes
- Order: Asterinales
- Family: Parmulariaceae
- Genus: Cycloschizon; Henn.

Type species
- Cycloschizon brachylaenae (Rehm) Henn.

Genus of fungi

Cycloschizon is a genus of fungi in the family Parmulariaceae.

== Species ==
- Cycloschizon alyxiae
- Cycloschizon araucariae
- Cycloschizon brachylaenae
- Cycloschizon capense
- Cycloschizon ciferrianum
- Cycloschizon discoideum
- Cycloschizon elaeicolum
- Cycloschizon fimbriatum
- Cycloschizon macarangae
- Cycloschizon oleae-dioicae
- Cycloschizon pollaccii
- Cycloschizon porrigo
- Cycloschizon pritzelii
- Cycloschizon styracis
