= Polycyclus =

Scientific classification
- Kingdom: Fungi
- Division: Ascomycota
- Class: Dothideomycetes
- Order: Asterinales
- Family: Parmulariaceae
- Genus: Polycyclus; Höhn.

Type species
- Polycyclus andinus (Pat.) Theiss. & Syd.

Species
- P. andinus P. marginalis P. rhytismoides

Genus of fungi

Polycyclus is a genus of fungi in the family Parmulariaceae.
