= Diplochlamys =

Diplochlamys may refer to:

- a synonym for the plant genus Hancea
- Diplochlamys (protist), an ameboid protist genus in the family Microcoryciidae in the order Arcellinida
