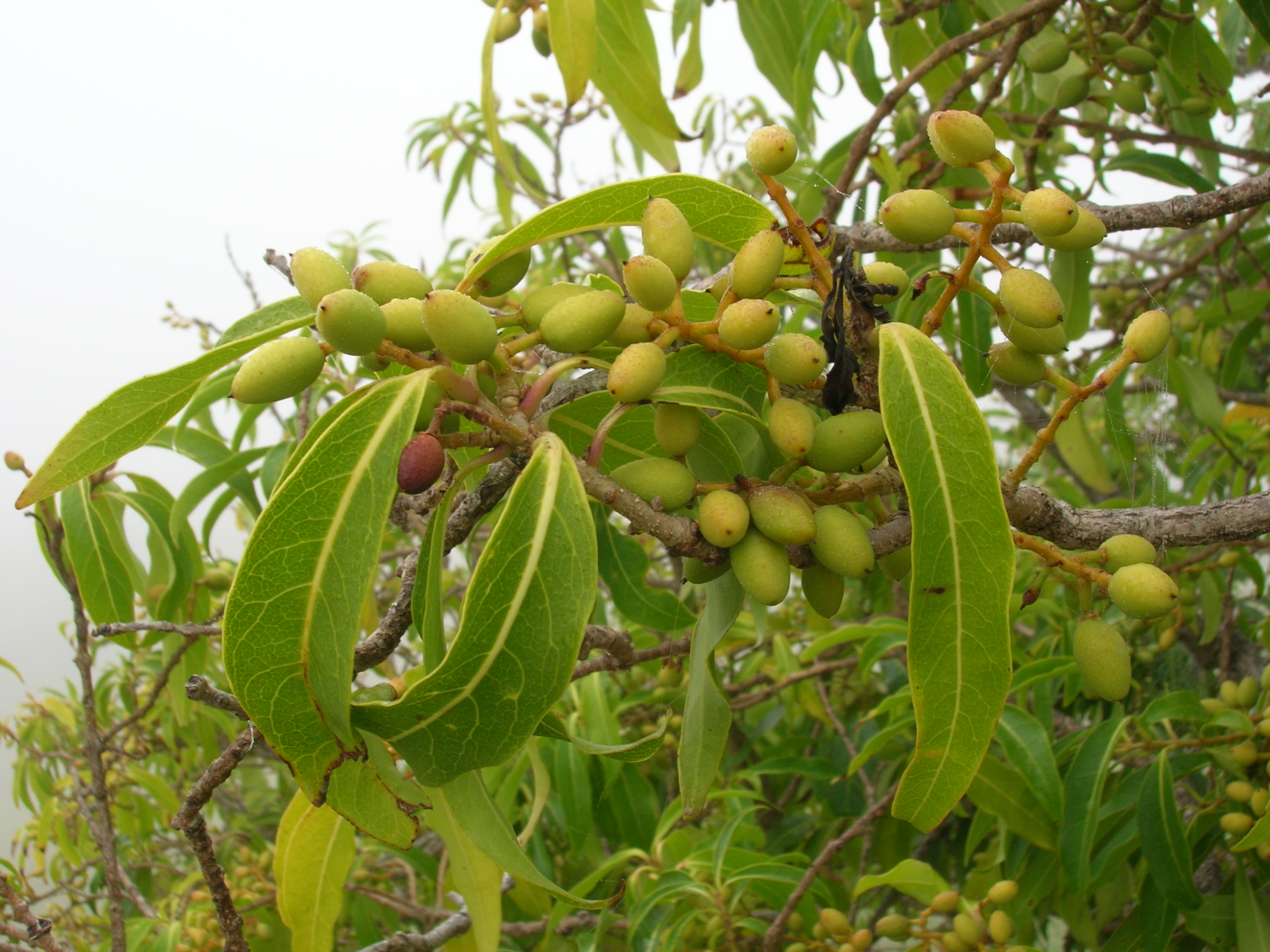

Scientific classification
- Kingdom: Plantae
- Clade: Tracheophytes
- Clade: Angiosperms
- Clade: Eudicots
- Clade: Asterids
- Order: Lamiales
- Family: Oleaceae
- Genus: Notelaea
- Species: N. sandwicensis

Binomial name
- Notelaea sandwicensis (A.Gray) Hong-Wa & Besnard

Synonyms
- Gymnelaea sandwicensis (A.Gray) L.A.S.Johnson; Nestegis sandwicensis (A.Gray) O.Deg., I.Deg. & L.A.S.Johnson; Gymnelaea sandwicensis (A.Gray) L.A.S.Johnson; Olea sandwicensis A.Gray; Osmanthus sandwicensis (A.Gray) Benth. & Hook.f. ex B.D.Jacks.

= Notelaea sandwicensis =

Species of tree

Notelaea sandwicensis, commonly known as Hawaiʻi olive or olopua, is a species of flowering tree in the olive family, Oleaceae, that is endemic to the major islands of the Hawaiian Islands.

== Taxonomy ==
A 2022 phylogenetic and biogeographical analysis by Julia Dupin et al. of the Pacific clade of Oleaceae (consisting of the generic complex Nestegis, Notelaea, Osmanthus, Phillyrea, and Picconia) found a lack of clear apomorphies and a broad morphological overlap between the genera of the Pacific clade, and subsumed all Pacific taxa, including Nestegis sandwicensis - now Notelaea sandwicensis - under genus Notelaea.

The specific epithet, sandwicensis, references the former name for the Hawaiian Islands, the Sandwich Islands.

== Description ==
This long-lived, slow-growing brevideciduous species is typically found as a small tree of around 20 ft (6.1 m) in height, with a short, stout trunk measuring up to 8 in (20 cm) in diameter. It can attain heights of up to 66 ft (20 m), and a trunk diameter of up to 3 ft (0.91 m). Olopua may grow as either a single-stemmed tree, a growth habit most often seen on level, stable ground, or in a multi-stemmed, more shrub-like form, which is commonly seen in individuals growing on unstable ground or steep slopes.

Olopua's sapwood is yellow, and its heartwood is light red to yellowish brown or dark brown with black streaks. Wood from mature trees is dense and durable, being fine-textured, heavy, and hard. Olopua wood polishes finely, and is sometimes used for woodworking to make bowls.

Mature trees have thick, corrugated bark. The inner bark is brown in color, and dry and bitter; exterior bark is gray and rough in texture, with furrowed ridges and plates. Twigs and young branches are brown or gray, with raised bumps and paired, raised half-circle leaf scars; the long pointed buds, which measure 3 mm (0.12 in) are gray and have a scaly texture and fine downy covering.

The lance-shaped, somewhat stiff, leathery leaves grow on light yellow leaf stalks, oppositely arranged on the stem. Leaf size is variable, but on average leaves reach 3–10 in (7.6–25.4 cm) long and 2-6 cm wide. Joseph Rock noted potential differences in leaf shape among different populations, reporting that Molokaʻi specimens had elliptical, lanceolate leaves while those on Kauaʻi had very large, oblong acuminate leaves. The upper surface of the leaf is glossy and dark green, and the underside is dull and lighter green. Leaves typically have a prominent yellow midrib. Leaf morphology is influenced by water availability - olopua in mesic forests have thinner, glossier leaves, while olopua of drier forests have duller, thicker leaves.

Small, yellowish-green bisexual flowers are borne in clusters at the bases of the leaves. Fruits mature from green into dark purple to blue-black egg-shaped drupes of about 13-22mm in length with a single seed. Fruits are edible but do not have an appealing taste, being fleshy and somewhat dry. On Oʻahu, olopua flowers during the spring, with fruits ripening in summer. Fruits have sometimes been observed ripening as early as January.

== Distribution ==
Olopua is endemic to the Hawaiian Islands, being found on Kauaʻi, Oʻahu, Maui, Lānaʻi, and Hawaiʻi at elevations of 30–1,300 m (98–4,265 ft) as a relatively common species of coastal mesic and mixed mesic forests and dry forests.

== Habitat and ecology ==
Olopua is a common species of remnant dry to mesic forests, especially on the leeward sides of the islands; it is seldom found in wetter environments such as rainforests or rainforest edges. It is a common understory tree in upland koa (Acacia koa) forests, and can be found as a canopy tree, particularly in lowland forests. It can be found as a co-dominant species alongside lama (Diospyros sandwicensis) in some forests, and has been observed as a dominant tree of former lava fields and mature dry to mesic montane woodlands below 1,300 m (4,300 ft).

Along with ʻōhiʻa, it is a host plant for kāhuli, Hawaiian land snails of genus Achatinella, including species such as Newcombia canaliculata, Achatinella mustelina, and Partulina confusa.

The fruits of olopua likely provide food for invertebrates and birds; they are known to be eaten by ʻōmaʻo (Myadestes obscurus). A study of captive ‘alalā (Corvus hawaiiensis) found that adult nonreproductive ‘alalā did not ingest olopua fruits, but they were observed carrying and caching fruit, suggesting they may play a role in seed dispersal in the wild.

Along with Myoporum species, olopua is a host for several species of Hawaiian Drosophila flies, including Drosophila silvarentis, Drosophila gradata, and Drosophila hawaiiensis. These flies have specialized to use sap exudates of the tree as sites for breeding and feeding. It has also been noted as a host plant or habitat for various other endemic Hawaiian insects, including Orthotylus nestegiae, Rhyncogonus giffardi, Leialoha oceanides, Leialoha scaevolae, Nesothoe hula, Nesothoe semialba, Proterhinus eugonias, Proterhinus pusilis, and several species of leaf-roller moths in the genus Limua.

Olopua has also been recorded as a host species for several species of endemic Hawaiian fungi, including Aulacostroma osmanthi, Meliola osmanthi, Calothyriella osmanthi, Calothyrium osmanthi, Asterinella intensa, and Coprinopsis extinctoria.

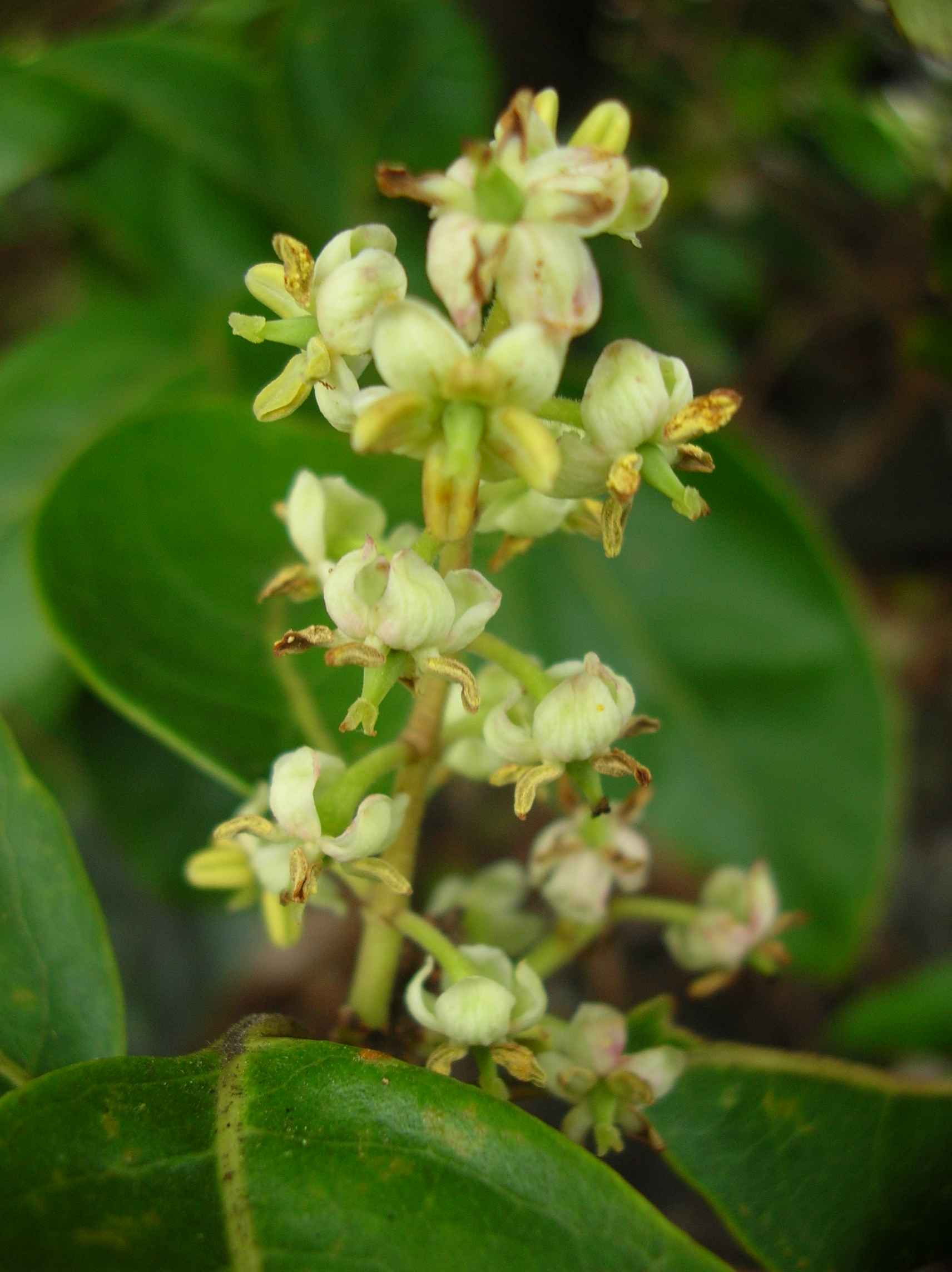
Olopua flowers, on Maui.

== Uses ==
Native Hawaiians used the hard wood of olopua to make ʻau koʻi (adze handles), apuapu (rasps for making fish hooks), ʻōʻō (digging sticks), lāʻau melomelo (fishing lures), pou (house posts), pāhoa (daggers), pīkoi (tripping weapons similar to a rope dart), and spears. Because the wood burned well even if green, it was used as wahie (firewood). It is possible that, following Polynesian settlement, usage of olopua for firewood, construction, and tool fabrication may have resulted in population decline for the species.

== Status ==
Olopua is not listed as federally endangered, and is classified on the IUCN Red List as Vulnerable. Major threats to this species are competition for resources with and habitat alteration by invasive plant species, increasing wildfire frequency, and predation and habitat degradation caused by invasive animal species. Trampling, rooting for food, grazing, and browsing by feral pigs (Sus domesticus), goats (Capra hircus), and chital (Axis axis) causes damage to both habitat and individual plants. The introduced black rat (Rattus rattus) eats plant parts, fruits, and seeds, and is known to gnaw on olopua bark; in some instances, gnawing by black rats has stripped enough of the cambium layer that affected branches or limbs have died. Introduced species of slugs and snails feed on leaves, stems, and seedlings.

Each of the main Hawaiian Islands, save for Kaho'olawe and Ni'ihau, has a continuous subpopulation of olopua, with portions of these contiguous populations occurring in many protected areas. There are at least ten extant subpopulations of the olopua. However, the population is declining as a result of the impact of invasive species - namely, ongoing decreases in quality of habitat and range of the species. There is ongoing ex situ conservation of this species, including outplantings, propagations, seed storage, and cultivation, and it is commonly used in environmental restoration projects.

The black twig borer (Xylosandrus compactus) reportedly devastated wild olopua populations in the late 20th century, with many remaining trees being reduced in size and vigor due to chronic infestation or repeated attacks.

== Gallery ==
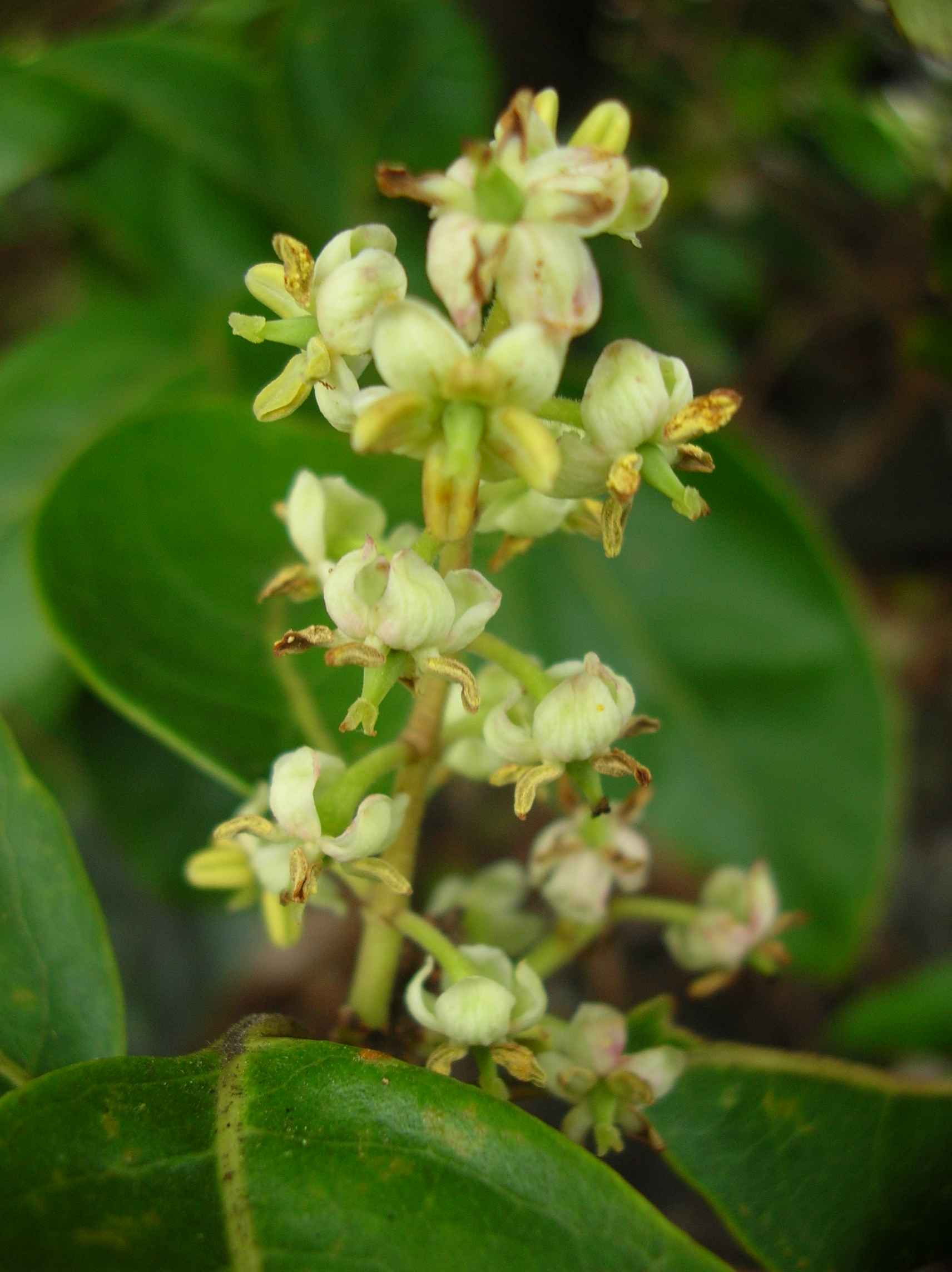
Olopua flowers, in Maui.

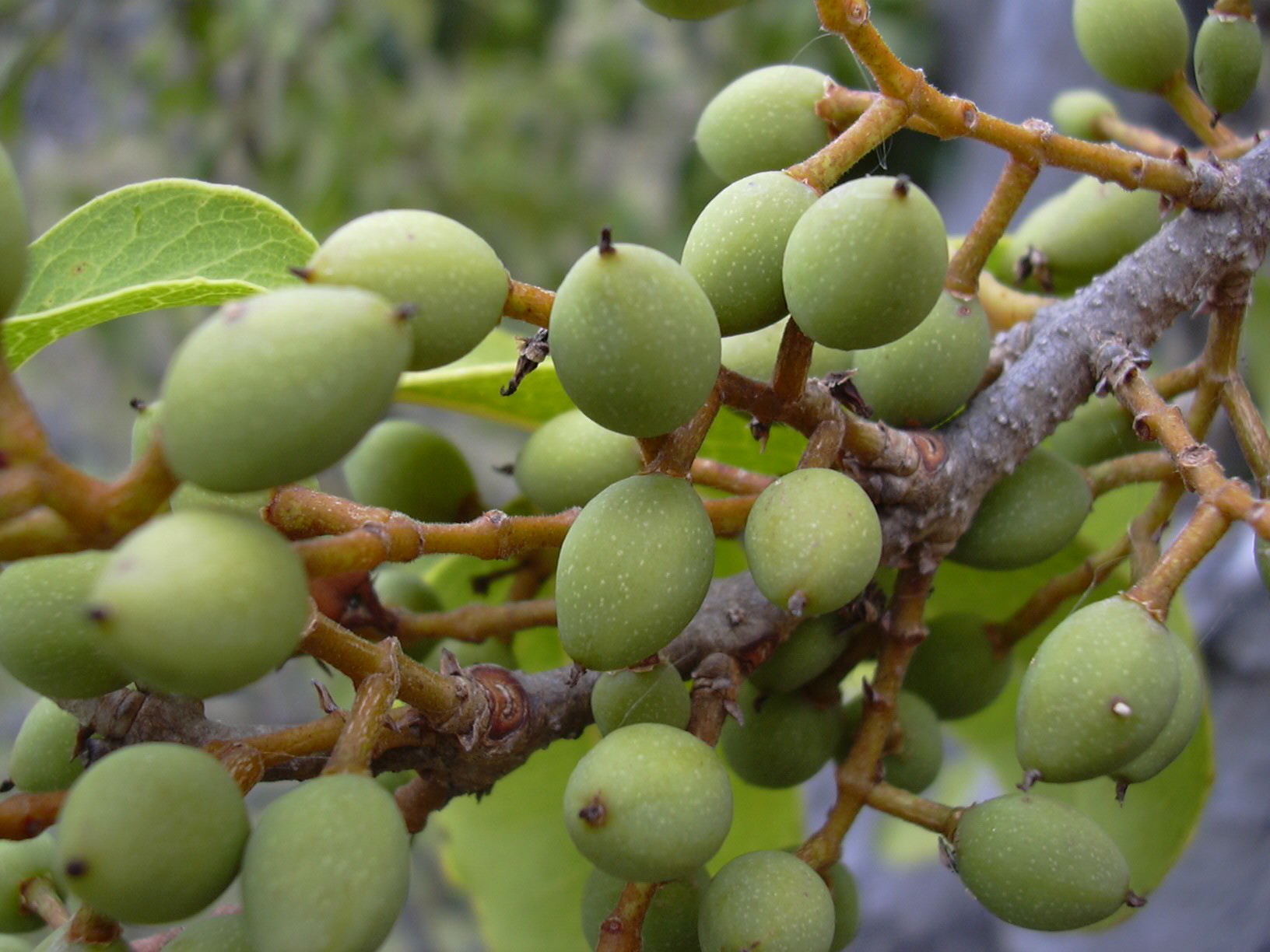
Unripe olopua fruit, in Maui.

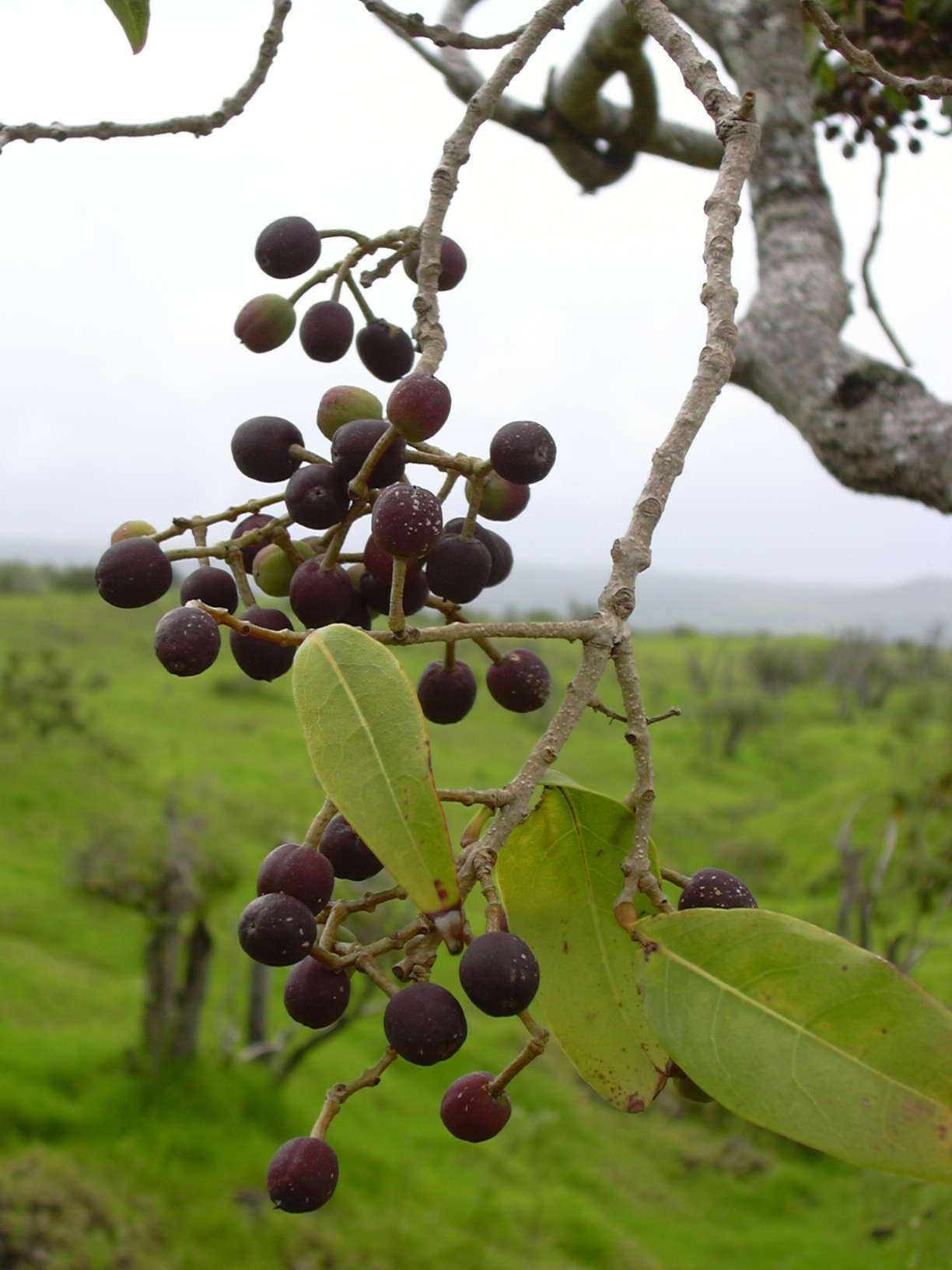
Ripe olopua fruit, in Maui.

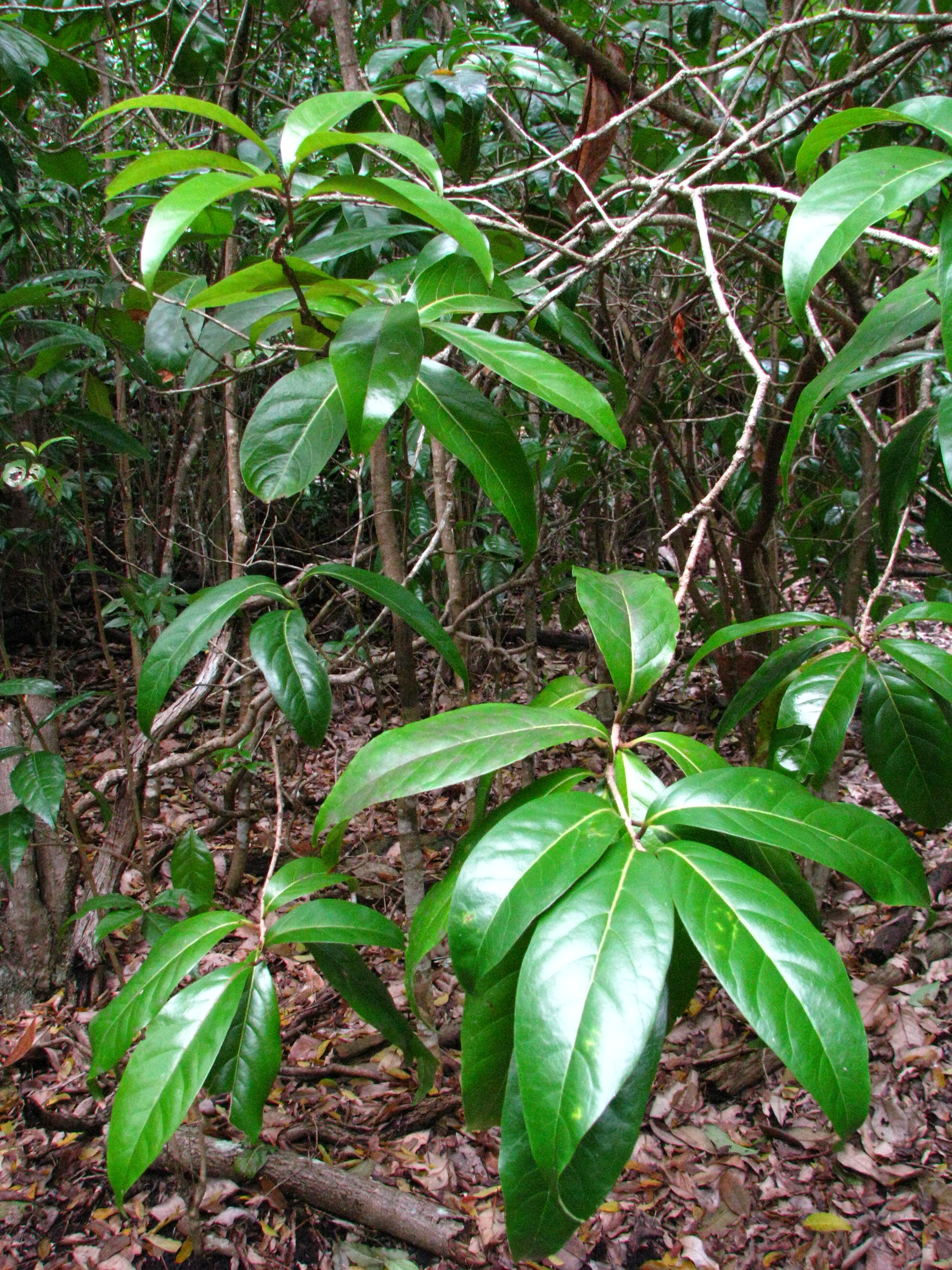
Olopua branches in Kīpukapuala, Hawaiʻi.

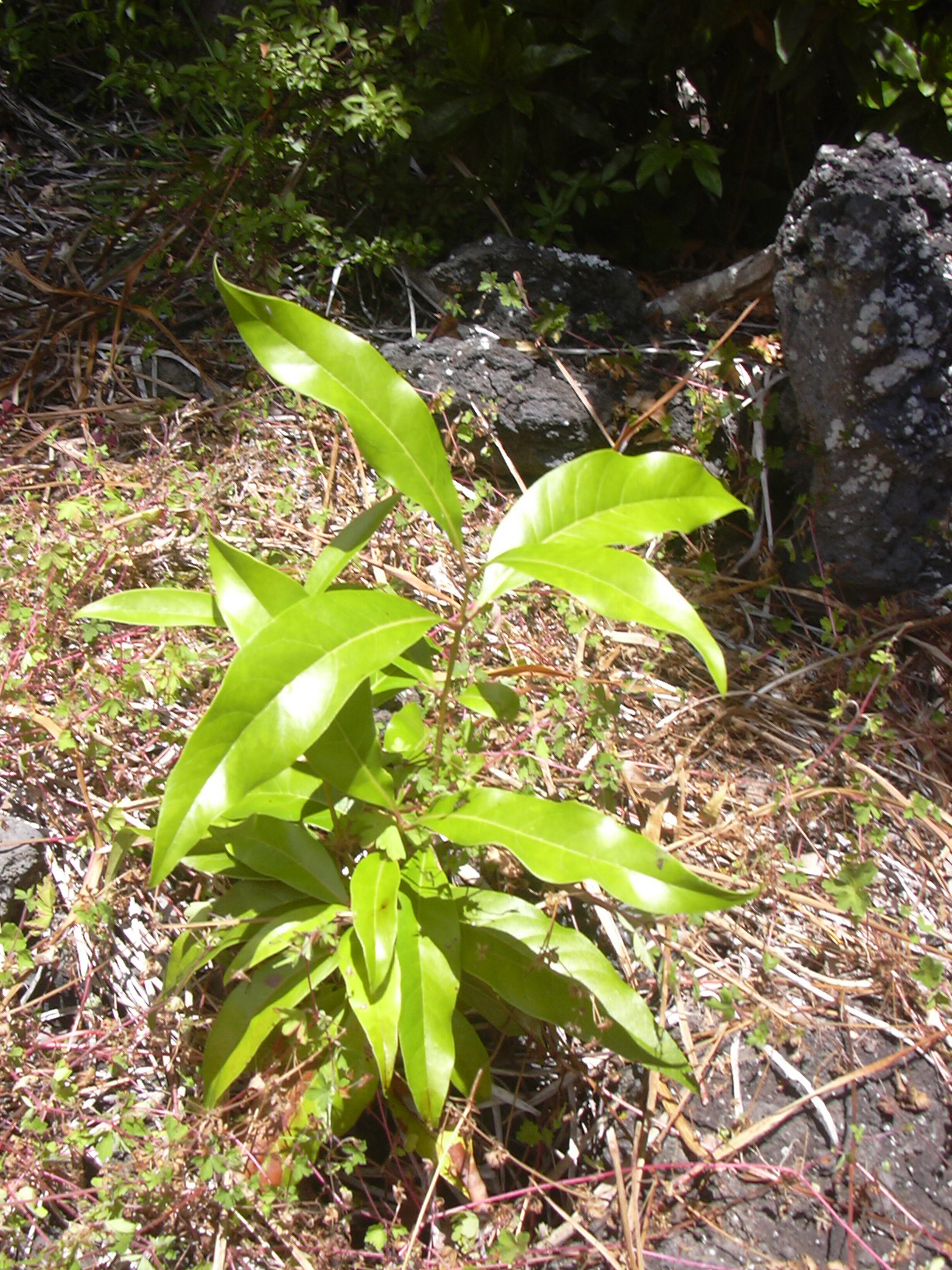
Young olopua tree planted in the Auwahi forest, in Maui.

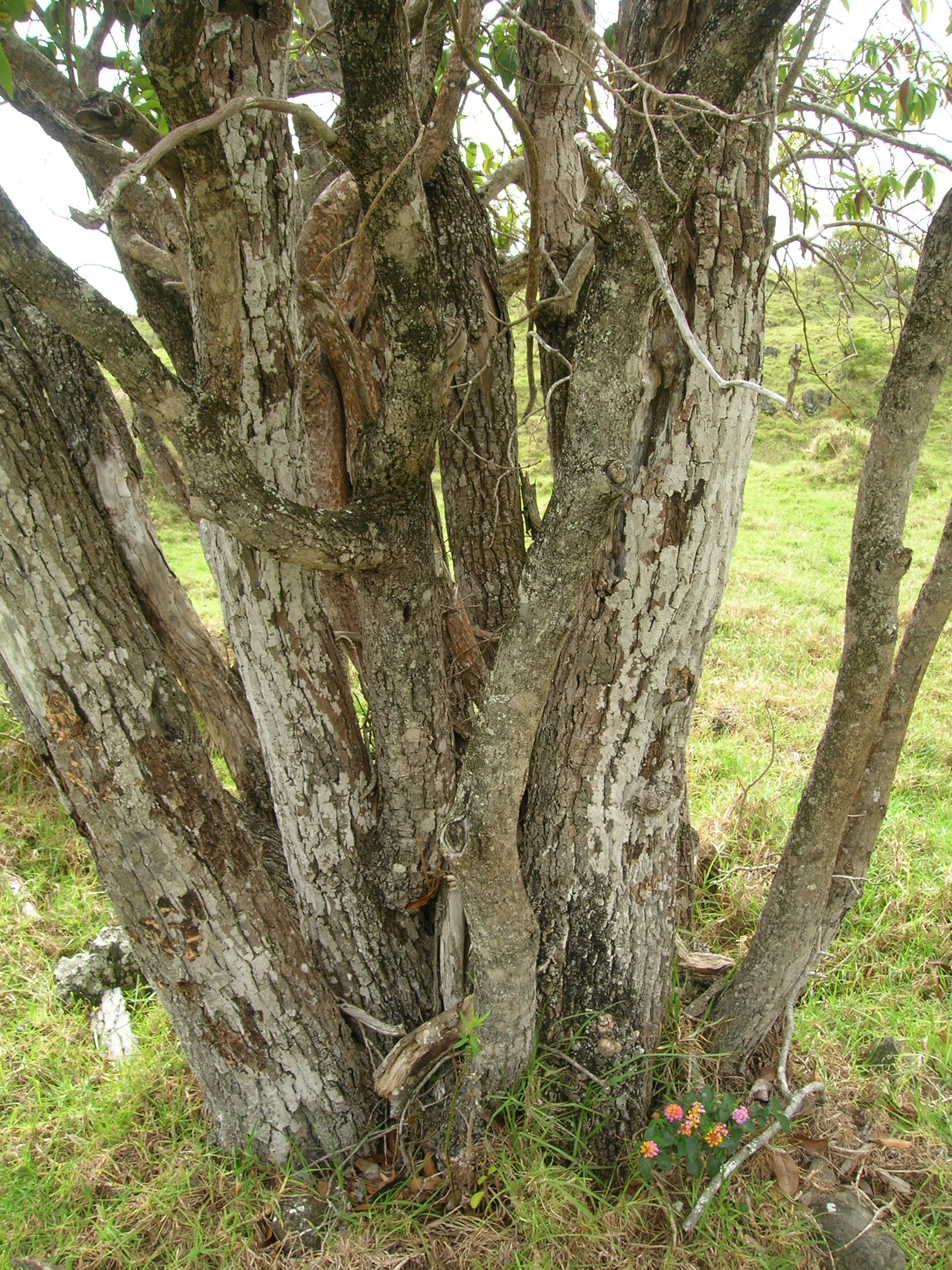
Multi-stemmed trunks of an olopua tree, in Maui.

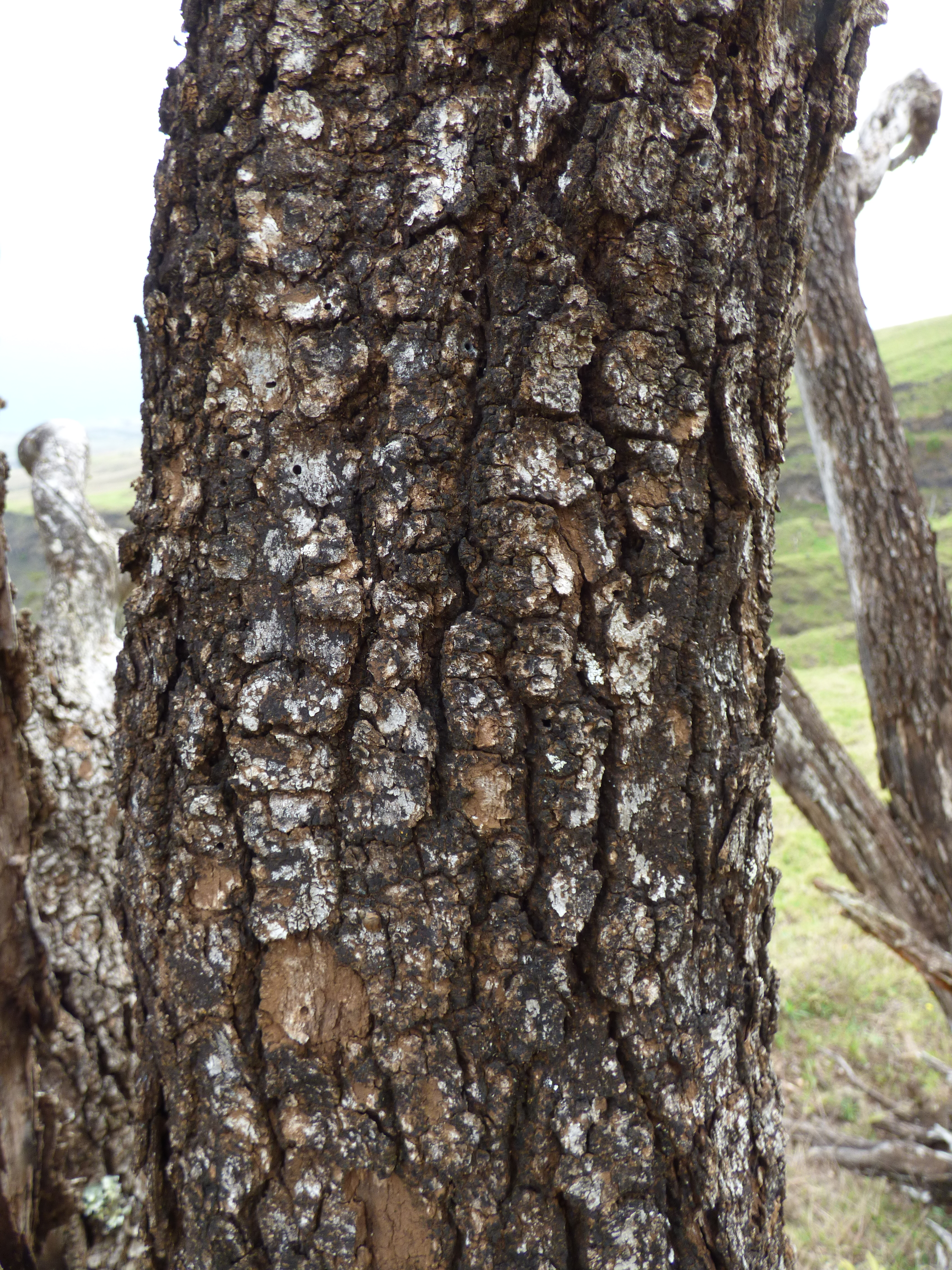
Olopua bark, in Maui.

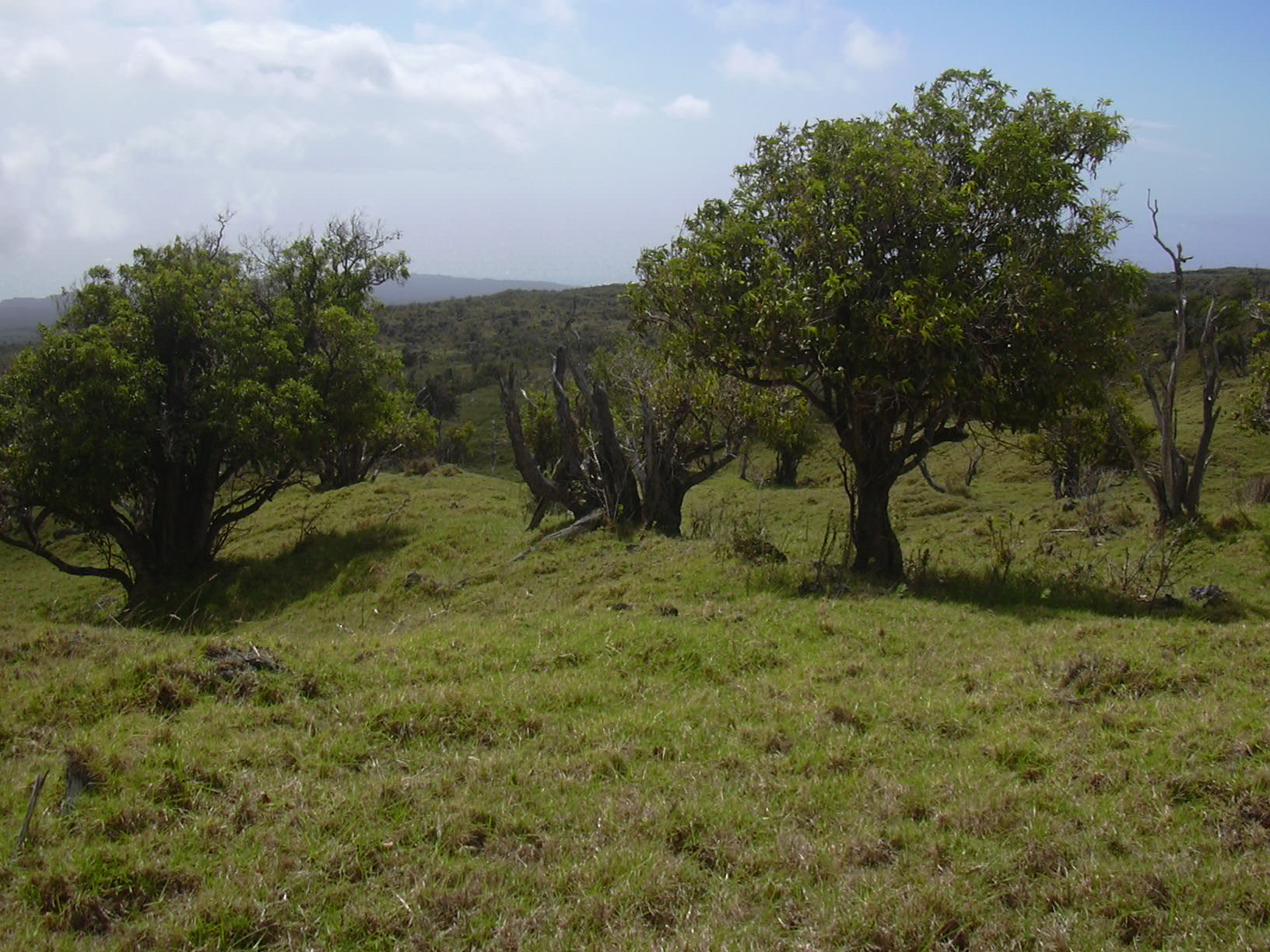
Olopua trees in the Auwahi forest area, in Maui.
