= Hemigrapha graphidicola =

Scientific classification
- Kingdom: Fungi
- Division: Ascomycota
- Class: Dothideomycetes
- Order: Asterinales
- Family: Hemigraphaceae
- Genus: Hemigrapha
- Species: H. graphidicola

Binomial name
- Hemigrapha graphidicola Diederich & Common (2019)

Species of fungi

Hemigrapha graphidicola is a species of fungus in the family Hemigraphaceae. It is a lichenicolous fungus that grows on the thallus of the script lichen Graphis assimilis and has only been collected in Fakahatchee Strand Preserve State Park in Florida. This state park is located in the Florida Everglades, which makes Hemigrapha graphidicola a mangrove species.

It is identifiable by its black, superficial, flat, roundish to elongate or irregular form.

Hemigrapha species are very similar, so Hemigrapha graphidicola should be identified under a microscope. Hemigrapha graphidicola is unique because it is the first Hemigrapha species that has been described to grow on a corticolous lichen, and the first member that grows on a member of the Graphidaceae. Infection by the fungus does not appear to visibly damage the host lichen.

Hemigrapha graphidicola was first described by Paul Diedrich and Ralph Common in 2019.
