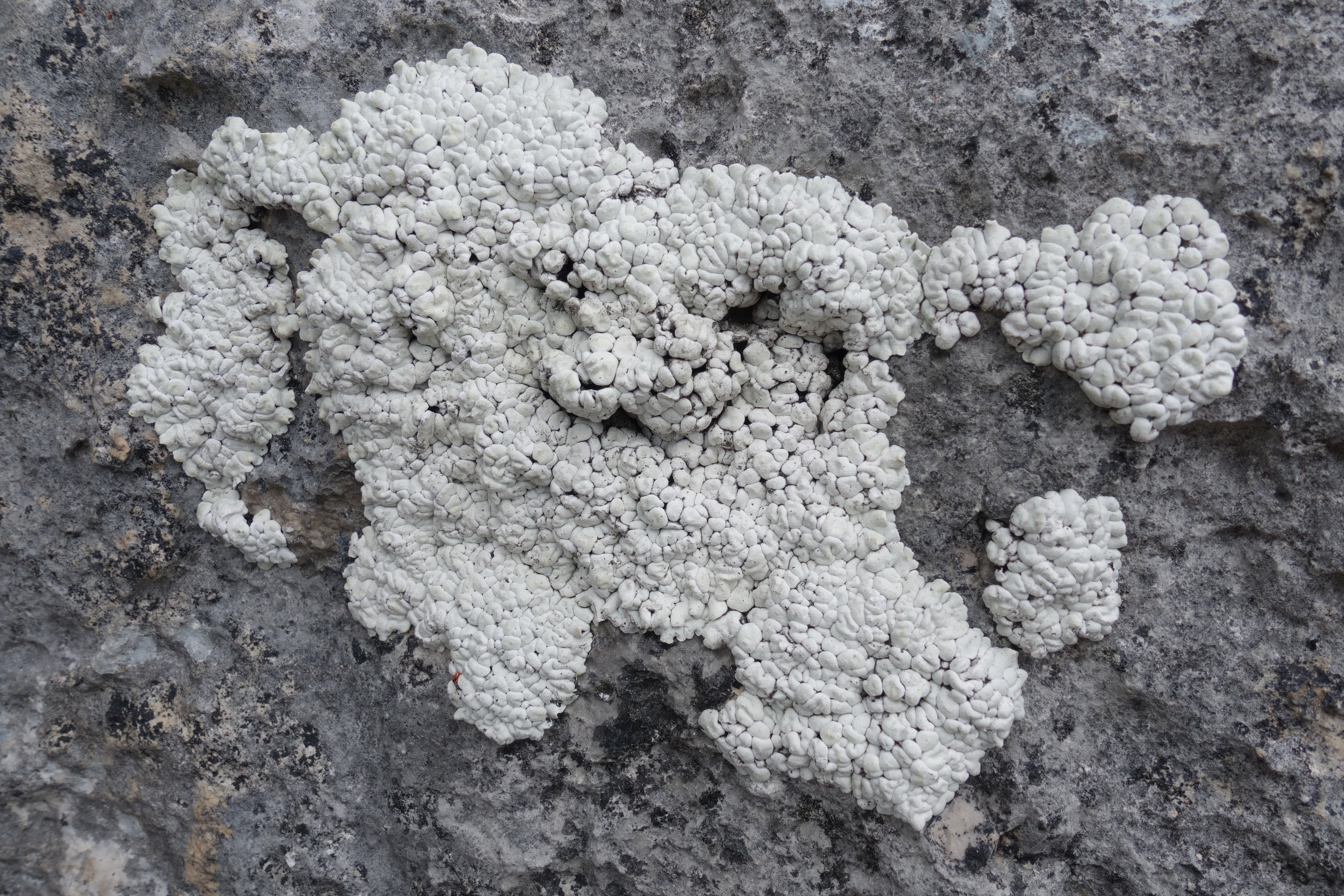
- Squamarina lamarckii growing on limestone, Austria

Scientific classification
- Kingdom: Fungi
- Division: Ascomycota
- Class: Lecanoromycetes
- Order: Lecanorales
- Family: Stereocaulaceae
- Genus: Squamarina; Poelt (1958)

Type species
- Squamarina gypsacea (Sm.) Poelt (1958)

Species
- See text

Synonyms
- Squammaria DC. (1805)

= Squamarina =

Genus of lichen-forming fungi

Squamarina is a genus of lichens in the family Stereocaulaceae. They form patches of radiating lobes or overlapping scales (squamules), with a well-developed upper cortex and no lower cortex. They grow on calcareous soil and rocks. Squamarina lentigera can be used to make a yellow dye.

== Taxonomy ==
The genus Squamarina was circumscribed by the lichenologist Josef Poelt in 1959, with Squamarina gypsacea designated as the type species. The genus belongs to the family Lecanoraceae and was created to accommodate species previously classified under Lecanora and Psora. Squamarina gypsacea, originally described by Georg Heinrich Weber as Lichen lentigerus, had been transferred through various genera including Lecanora, Psora, and Parmularia before Poelt's generic reassignment. The genus name Squamarina is derived from the Latin squama (scale), referring to the characteristic squamulose thallus structure of these lichens. Poelt's circumscription recognised Squamarina as distinct from related genera based on its combination of morphological and anatomical characteristics, particularly the structure of the thallus and apothecia (fruiting bodies).

A 2020 reassessment of several Asian species traditionally placed in Squamarina showed that most of them do not belong in the genus. Material from their type localities in China demonstrated that S. callichroa and S. pachyphylla fall within Rhizoplaca, and that S. semisterilis belongs in Lobothallia. S. chondroderma was judged better retained in Lecanora for the time being. Only S. kansuensis and S. oleosa were confirmed as genuine members of Squamarina under their revised generic concept.

== Description ==
Squamarina species form squamulose thalli—that is, mats of overlapping, scale-like lobes whose edges are often lobed again. The upper surface may carry a fine, whitish bloom (pruina), while the sturdy cortex beneath is sharply set off from the soft interior. A green alga with spherical cells (a chlorococcoid photobiont) occupies the upper part of the thallus, and below it lies a thick, densely packed white medulla that gives the scales their firmness.

Fruiting bodies are apothecia that start out concave, soon flatten and may become gently domed. Each is ringed by a rim of thallus tissue (the thalline margin) that is conspicuous at first but can wear away so the yellow- to red-brown disc eventually sits flush with the scales. The disc surface is sprinkled with minute granules (a granular epithecium), and the spore layer is pierced by slender, colourless threads called paraphyses. Asci conform to the Bacidia-type and contain eight colourless ascospores, each without cross-walls (aseptate). Asexual reproduction occurs in tiny flask-shaped pycnidia that release curved, hair-like conidia. Chemical tests reveal usnic acid, various β-depsidones and other still-unidentified compounds, which together help separate Squamarina from superficially similar genera.

== Species ==
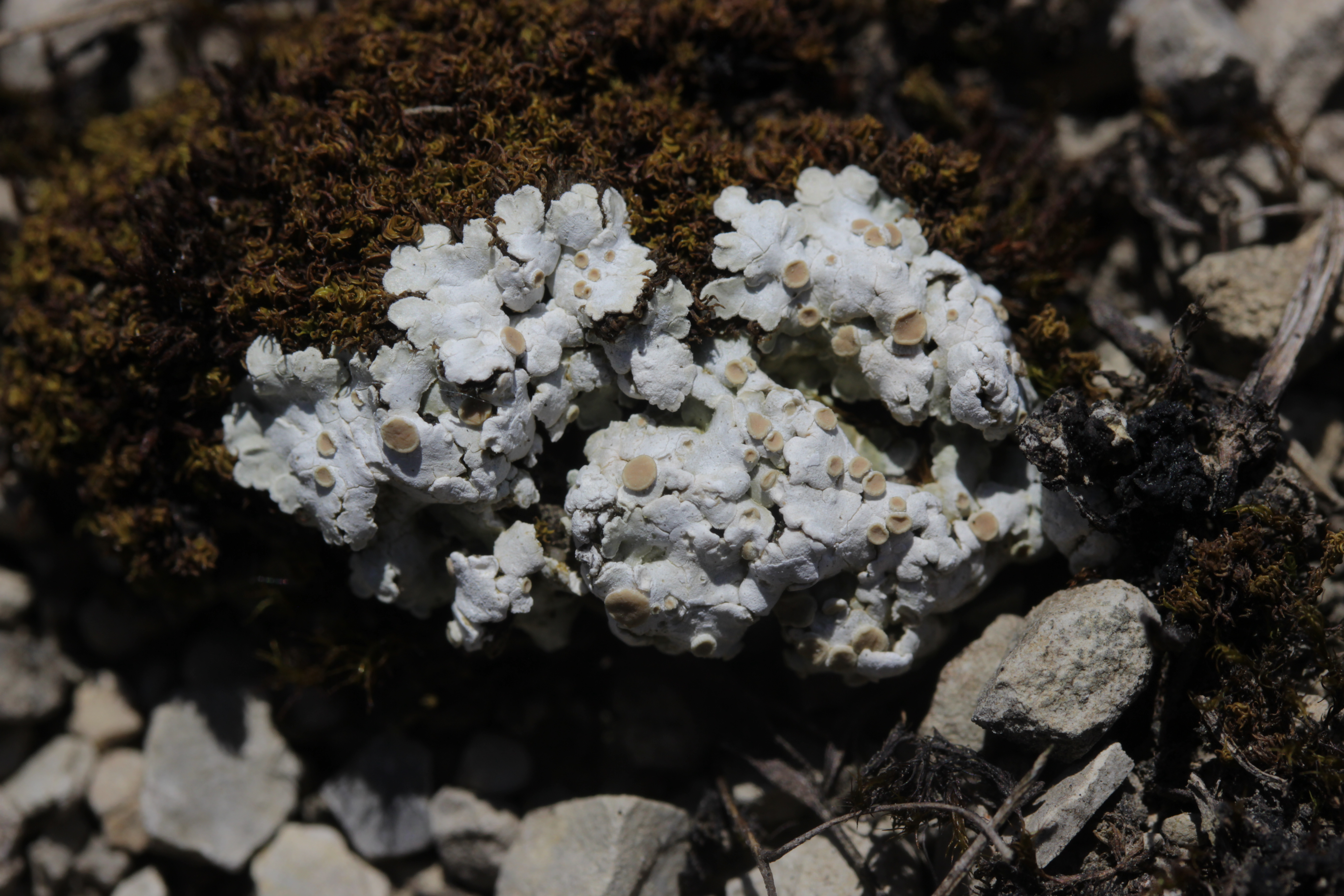
Squamarina lentigera

As of November 2025, Species Fungorum (in the Catalogue of Life) accepts 28 species of Squamarina.

- Squamarina brunneola Poumarat & Cl.Roux (2024)
- Squamarina calesensis Cl.Roux & Poumarat (2024)
- Squamarina cartilaginea (With.) P.James (1980)
- Squamarina clauzadei Cl.Roux & Poumarat (2024)
- Squamarina confusa Cl.Roux & Poumarat (2024)
- Squamarina dufourii (Fr.) Cl.Roux & Poumarat (2024)
- Squamarina gypsacea (Sm.) Poelt (1958)
- Squamarina haysomii C.W.Dodge 1970)
- Squamarina kansuensis (H.Magn.) Poelt (1958)
- Squamarina lentigera (Weber) Poelt (1958)
- Squamarina oleosa (Zahlbr.) Poelt (1958)
- Squamarina palmyrensis (H.Magn.) S.Y.Kondr. (2002)
- Squamarina paradoxa Cl.Roux & Poumarat (2024)
- Squamarina pseudocrassa (Mattick) Cl.Roux & Poumarat (2024)
- Squamarina scopulorum Haugan & Timdal (1992)
- Squamarina subcetrarioides (Zahlbr.) Y.Y.Zhang (2023)
- Squamarina terricola Cl.Roux & Poumarat (2024)
