= Symphaeophyma =

Scientific classification
- Kingdom: Fungi
- Division: Ascomycota
- Class: Dothideomycetes
- Order: Asterinales
- Family: Parmulariaceae
- Genus: Symphaeophyma; Speg.

Type species
- Symphaeophyma subtropicale Speg.

Genus of fungi

Symphaeophyma is a genus of fungi in the family Parmulariaceae. A monotypic genus, it contains the single species Symphaeophyma subtropicale.
