= Viegasella =

Scientific classification
- Kingdom: Fungi
- Division: Ascomycota
- Class: Dothideomycetes
- Order: Asterinales
- Family: Parmulariaceae
- Genus: Viegasella; Inácio & P.F. Cannon

Type species
- Viegasella pulchella (Speg.) Inácio & P.F. Cannon (2003)

Genus of fungi

Viegasella is a genus of fungi in the family Parmulariaceae. This is a monotypic genus, containing the single species Viegasella pulchella.
