= Kiehlia =

Scientific classification
- Kingdom: Fungi
- Division: Ascomycota
- Class: Dothideomycetes
- Order: Asterinales
- Family: Parmulariaceae
- Genus: Kiehlia; Viégas

Type species
- Kiehlia obscura Viégas

Genus of fungi

Kiehlia is a genus of fungi in the family Parmulariaceae. The genus was first described by Ahmés Pinto Viégas in 1944.
