= Englerodothis =

Scientific classification
- Kingdom: Fungi
- Division: Ascomycota
- Class: Dothideomycetes
- Order: Asterinales
- Family: Parmulariaceae
- Genus: Englerodothis; Theiss. & Syd. (1915)

Type species
- Englerodothis kilimandscharica (Henn.) Theiss. & Syd. (1915)

Species
- E. grovei E. kilimandscharica E. oleae

Genus of fungi

Englerodothis is a genus of fungi in the family Parmulariaceae.

The genus was circumscribed in Ann. Mycol. Vol.13 on page 285 in 1915 by Ferdinand Theissen and Hans Sydow.

The genus name of Englerodothis is in honour of Heinrich Gustav Adolf Engler (1844 – 1930), who was a German botanist. He is notable for his work on plant taxonomy and phytogeography.
