= Inocyclus =

Scientific classification
- Kingdom: Fungi
- Division: Ascomycota
- Class: Dothideomycetes
- Order: Asterinales
- Family: Parmulariaceae
- Genus: Inocyclus; Theiss. & Syd.

Type species
- Inocyclus psychotriae Syd. & P. Syd.

Species
- I. australiensis I. blechni I. calotheus I. discoideus I. dovyalidis I. myrtacearum I. psychotriae

Genus of fungi

Inocyclus is a genus of fungi in the family Parmulariaceae.
