= Palawaniella =

Scientific classification
- Kingdom: Fungi
- Division: Ascomycota
- Class: Dothideomycetes
- Order: Asterinales
- Family: Parmulariaceae
- Genus: Palawaniella; Doidge

Type species
- Palawaniella eucleae Doidge

Genus of fungi

Palawaniella is a genus of fungi in the family Parmulariaceae.

== Species ==
- Palawaniella brosimi
- Palawaniella castanopsidis
- Palawaniella eucleae
- Palawaniella halleriae
- Palawaniella jasmini
- Palawaniella nectandrae
- Palawaniella orbiculata
- Palawaniella xylopiae
