= Kentingia =

Scientific classification
- Kingdom: Fungi
- Division: Ascomycota
- Class: Dothideomycetes
- Order: Asterinales
- Family: Parmulariaceae
- Genus: Kentingia; Sivan. & W.H. Hsieh

Type species
- Kentingia corticola Sivan. & W.H. Hsieh

Genus of fungi

Kentingia is a genus of fungi in the family Parmulariaceae. A monotypic genus, it contains the single species Kentingia corticola
