= Mintera =

Scientific classification
- Kingdom: Fungi
- Division: Ascomycota
- Class: Dothideomycetes
- Order: Asterinales
- Family: Parmulariaceae
- Genus: Mintera; Inácio & P.F. Cannon

Type species
- Mintera reticulata (Starbäck) Inácio & P.F. Cannon

Genus of fungi

Mintera is a genus of fungi in the family Parmulariaceae. A monotypic genus, it contains the single species Mintera reticulata.
