= Dothidasteroma =

Scientific classification
- Kingdom: Fungi
- Division: Ascomycota
- Class: Dothideomycetes
- Order: Asterinales
- Family: Parmulariaceae
- Genus: Dothidasteroma; Höhn.

Type species
- Dothidasteroma pterygotae (Berk. & Broome) Höhn.

Species
- D. casuarinae D. dipteridis D. maculosum D. pterygotae

Genus of fungi

Dothidasteroma is a genus of fungi in the family Parmulariaceae.
