= Thallomyces =

Scientific classification
- Kingdom: Fungi
- Division: Ascomycota
- Class: Dothideomycetes
- Order: Asterinales
- Family: Parmulariaceae
- Genus: Thallomyces; H.J. Swart

Type species
- Thallomyces oritis (Hansf.) H.J. Swart

Genus of fungi

Thallomyces is a genus of fungi in the family Parmulariaceae. A monotypic genus, it contains the single species Thallomyces oritis.
