= Hysterostomella =

Scientific classification
- Kingdom: Fungi
- Division: Ascomycota
- Class: Dothideomycetes
- Order: Asterinales
- Family: Parmulariaceae
- Genus: Hysterostomella; Speg.

Type species
- Hysterostomella guaranitica Speg.

Species
- See text.

Genus of fungi

Hysterostomella is a genus of fungi in the family Parmulariaceae.

== Species ==
As of February 2026, Species Fungorum listed the following species:

- Hysterostomella bakeri (Theiss. & Syd.) Inácio & P.F. Cannon
- Hysterostomella bosciae (Doidge) Doidge
- Hysterostomella callista Arx
- Hysterostomella chaetocarpi Hansf.
- Hysterostomella circinata Speg.
- Hysterostomella connari Inácio, Pereira-Carv., É.S.C. Souza, H.B. Sales & Dianese
- Hysterostomella elaeidicola Maubl.
- Hysterostomella guaranitica Speg.
- Hysterostomella gymnosporiae Hansf.
- Hysterostomella leptospila (Berk. & M.A. Curtis) Höhn.
- Hysterostomella miconiae Henn.
- Hysterostomella opaca Doidge
- Hysterostomella orbiculata (Syd. & P. Syd.) Arx
- Hysterostomella osmanthi (F. Stevens & R.W. Ryan) Arx
- Hysterostomella oxyanthi (Doidge) Doidge
- Hysterostomella palmae (F. Stevens) Inácio & P.F. Cannon
- Hysterostomella phoebes Syd.
- Hysterostomella polyadelpha Arx
- Hysterostomella rhytismoides (Schwein. ex Berk. & M.A. Curtis) Rehm
- Hysterostomella sparsa (Peck & Clinton) M.E. Barr
- Hysterostomella spurcaria (Berk. & Broome) Höhn.
- Hysterostomella tenella Syd. & P. Syd.
- Hysterostomella tetracerae (F. Rudolphi) Höhn.
- Hysterostomella uleana Rehm
