= Parmulariaceae =

Scientific classification
- Kingdom: Fungi
- Division: Ascomycota
- Class: Dothideomycetes
- Order: Asterinales
- Family: Parmulariaceae; E.Müll. & Arx ex M.E.Barr (1979)

Type genus
- Parmularia Lév. (1846)

Family of fungi

The Parmulariaceae are a family of fungi with an uncertain taxonomic placement in the class Dothideomycetes.

== Genera ==
According to the 2007 Outline of Ascomycota, the following 34 genera are within the Parmulariaceae; the placement of Hemigrapha is uncertain.

Antoniomyces – Aldona – Apoa – Aldonata – Aulacostroma – Campoa – Coccodothis – Cocconia – Cycloschizon – Cyclostomella – Dictyocyclus – Dothidasteroma – Englerodothis – Ferrarisia – ?Hemigrapha – Hysterostomella – Inocyclus – ?Kentingia – Kiehlia – Mintera – Pachypatella – Palawania - Palawaniella – Parmularia – Parmulariopsella – Parmulariopsis – Parmulina – Perischizon – Polycyclina – Polycyclus – Protothyrium – Pseudolembosia – Rhagadolobiopsis – Rhagadolobium – Rhipidocarpon – Symphaeophyma – Thallomyces – Viegasiella
