= Cyclostomella =

Scientific classification
- Kingdom: Fungi
- Division: Ascomycota
- Class: Dothideomycetes
- Order: Asterinales
- Family: Parmulariaceae
- Genus: Cyclostomella; Pat.

Type species
- Cyclostomella disciformis Pat.

Species
- C. atramentaria C. disciformis C. oncophora C. theissenii

Genus of fungi

Cyclostomella is a genus of fungi in the family Parmulariaceae.
