= Parmulariopsis =

Scientific classification
- Kingdom: Fungi
- Division: Ascomycota
- Class: Dothideomycetes
- Order: Asterinales
- Family: Parmulariaceae
- Genus: Parmulariopsis; Petr.

Type species
- Parmulariopsis pulchella Petr.

Genus of fungi

Parmulariopsis is a genus of fungi in the family Parmulariaceae. A monotypic genus, it contains the single species Parmulariopsis pulchella.
