= Polycyclina =

Scientific classification
- Kingdom: Fungi
- Division: Ascomycota
- Class: Dothideomycetes
- Order: Asterinales
- Family: Parmulariaceae
- Genus: Polycyclina; Theiss. & Syd.

Type species
- Polycyclina rhytismoides (Speg.) Theiss. & Syd.

Genus of fungi

Polycyclina is a genus of fungi in the family Parmulariaceae. A monotypic genus, it contains the single species Polycyclina rhytismoides.
