= Pseudolembosia =

Scientific classification
- Kingdom: Fungi
- Division: Ascomycota
- Class: Dothideomycetes
- Order: Asterinales
- Family: Parmulariaceae
- Genus: Pseudolembosia; Theiss

Type species
- Pseudolembosia geographica (Massee) Theiss.

Species
- P. dominicana P. geographica P. lenticularis P. magnahypha P. magnifica P. orbicularis

Genus of fungi

Pseudolembosia is a genus of fungi in the family Parmulariaceae.
