= Rhipidocarpon =

Scientific classification
- Kingdom: Fungi
- Division: Ascomycota
- Class: Dothideomycetes
- Order: Asterinales
- Family: Parmulariaceae
- Genus: Rhipidocarpon (Theiss.) Theiss. & Syd.

Type species
- Rhipidocarpon javanicum (Pat.) Theiss. & Syd.

Genus of fungi

Rhipidocarpon is a genus of fungi in the family Parmulariaceae. A monotypic genus, it contains the single species Rhipidocarpon javanicum.
