= Ferrarisia =

Scientific classification
- Kingdom: Fungi
- Division: Ascomycota
- Class: Dothideomycetes
- Order: Asterinales
- Family: Parmulariaceae
- Genus: Ferrarisia; Sacc.

Type species
- Ferrarisia philippina Sacc.

Genus of fungi

Ferrarisia is a genus of fungi in the family Parmulariaceae.

The genus name of Ferrarisia is in honour of Teodoro Ferraris (1874–1943), who was an Italian botanist, Professor of Botany and Plantpathologist in Alba in 1909.

The genus was circumscribed by Pier Andrea Saccardo in Atti Accad. Veneto-Trent. series 3, Vol.10 on page 61 in 1919.

== Species ==
- Ferrarisia apiahyna
- Ferrarisia capparis
- Ferrarisia eugeniae
- Ferrarisia ipomoeae
- Ferrarisia jasmini
- Ferrarisia litseae
- Ferrarisia pamellisiae
- Ferrarisia pavettae
- Ferrarisia philippina
- Ferrarisia quercina
