= Dictyocyclus =

Scientific classification
- Kingdom: Fungi
- Division: Ascomycota
- Class: Dothideomycetes
- Order: Asterinales
- Family: Parmulariaceae
- Genus: Dictyocyclus; Sivan., W.H. Hsieh & Chi Y. Chen

Type species
- Dictyocyclus hydrangeae Sivan., W.H. Hsieh & Chi Y. Chen

Genus of fungi

Dictyocyclus is a genus of fungi in the family Parmulariaceae. A monotypic genus, it contains the single species Dictyocyclus hydrangeae.
