= Cocconia =

Scientific classification
- Kingdom: Fungi
- Division: Ascomycota
- Class: Dothideomycetes
- Order: Asterinales
- Family: Parmulariaceae
- Genus: Cocconia; Sacc.

Type species
- Cocconia placenta (Berk. & Broome) Sacc.

Genus of fungi

Cocconia is a genus of fungi in the family Parmulariaceae.

The genus name of Cocconia is in honour of Girolamo Cocconi (1822-1904), an Italian teacher, botanist and professor from the University of Bologna.

The genus was circumscribed by Pier Andrea Saccardo in Syll. Fung. Vol.8 on page 738 in 1889.

== Species ==
- Cocconia aliena
- Cocconia astrocaryi
- Cocconia banisteriae
- Cocconia capensis
- Cocconia coccolobae
- Cocconia concentrica
- Cocconia connari
- Cocconia discoidea
- Cocconia guatteriae
- Cocconia halleriae
- Cocconia lacarangae
- Cocconia macarangae
- Cocconia machaerii
- Cocconia miconiae
- Cocconia placenta
- Cocconia porrigo
- Cocconia sparsa
- Cocconia spurcaria
- Cocconia styracis
- Cocconia xylopiae
