= Campoa =

Scientific classification
- Kingdom: Fungi
- Division: Ascomycota
- Class: Dothideomycetes
- Order: Asterinales
- Family: Parmulariaceae
- Genus: Campoa; Speg.

Type species
- Campoa pulcherrima Speg.

Species
- C. apoensis C. hypocreoidea C. pulcherrima C. thujopsidis

Genus of fungi

Campoa is a genus of fungi in the family Parmulariaceae.
