= Carl Adolf Georg Lauterbach =

German explorer and botanist (1864–1937)

Carl Adolf Georg Lauterbach (21 April 1864 in Breslau – 1 September 1937 in Breslau) was a German explorer and botanist.

He studied natural sciences and agriculture at the Universities of Breslau and Heidelberg, obtaining his doctorate at the latter institution in 1888. Within the next twelve years he participated in three exploratory expeditions (1889, 1896 and 1899–1900) to Kaiser-Wilhelmsland (part of German New Guinea). On the two later expeditions, he explored the Bismarck Mountains, located in the island's interior. On the third mission (1899–1900) he was made director of the Neu-Guinea Compagnie. Some of the specimens that he collected were further examined by Viktor Ferdinand Brotherus and Paul Christoph Hennings.

At his estate in Stabelwitz, outside of Breslau (part of Breslau since 1928), he maintained an impressive plant nursery and arboretum.

He is commemorated with the genera Lauterbachia (family Monimiaceae), and Lauterbachiella (in the fungi family of Parmulariaceae). Which is now a synonym of Rhagadolobium P.Henn. & Lind. Also Clarorivinia (in the Euphorbiaceae family), which was named after the latin translation of his surname, is now a synonym of Ptychopyxis. The genus Gertrudia (formerly of the family Flacourtiaceae) was named after Lauterbach's wife, Gertrud Fuchs-Henel. It is now a synonym for Ryparosa. In 1897 Anton Reichenow named the yellow-breasted bowerbird (Chlamydera lauterbachi) in his honor.

== Selected works ==
- Eine Expedition zur Erforschung des Hinterlandes des Astrolabe Bai (Nachr. Kais. Wilh. Land 7, 1891, p. 31-62) – An expedition of research in the hinterlands of Astrolabe Bay.
- Die geographischen Ergebnisse der Kaiser Wilhelmsland Expedition (Zeitschr. Ges. Erdk. Berl. 33, 1898, p. 141-177 + 2 maps) – Geographical results of the Kaiser Wilhelmsland expedition.
- Die Flora der deutschen Schutzgebiete in der Südsee (with Karl Moritz Schumann), 1901 – Flora of the German protectorates in the South Seas.
- Nachträge zur Flora der deutschen Schutzgebiete in der Südsee : mit Ausschluss Samoa's und der Karolinen (with Karl Moritz Schumann), 1905 – Supplement to the flora of the German protectorates in the South Seas, excluding Samoa and the Caroline Islands.
- Beiträge zur flora von Papuasien, 1912 – Contribution to the flora of Papua New Guinea.
