= Rhagadolobium =

Scientific classification
- Kingdom: Fungi
- Division: Ascomycota
- Class: Dothideomycetes
- Order: Asterinales
- Family: Parmulariaceae
- Genus: Rhagadolobium; P. Henn. & Lindau

Type species
- Rhagadolobium hemitheliae Henn. & J. Lindau

Genus of fungi

Rhagadolobium is a genus of fungi in the family Parmulariaceae.

== Species ==
- Rhagadolobium ambiguum
- Rhagadolobium bakeri
- Rhagadolobium bakerianum
- Rhagadolobium cucurbitacearum
- Rhagadolobium dicksoniifolium
- Rhagadolobium filicum
- Rhagadolobium hemitheliae
- Rhagadolobium longissimum
- Rhagadolobium pteridis
- Rhagadolobium pulchellum
- Rhagadolobium stenochlaenae
