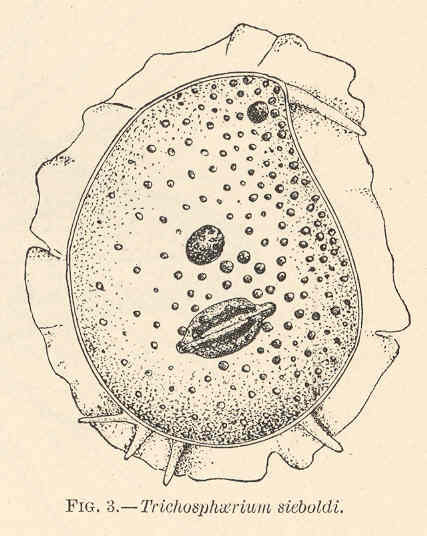
- Trichosphaerium sieboldi

Scientific classification
- Domain: Eukaryota
- Phylum: Amoebozoa
- Class: Tubulinea
- Clade: Corycidia; Kang et al., 2017

Clades
- Microcoryciidae; Trichosida

= Corycidia =

Group of amoebae

Corycidia (alternatively spelt Corycida) is a clade of amoeboid protists within the eukaryotic supergroup Amoebozoa. It contains all amoebae of the families Microcoryciidae, which was previously regarded as Arcellinida (an order of testate amoebae), and Trichosphaeriidae, which contains the sole genus Trichosphaerium.

== Taxonomy ==
Corycidia is defined as the least inclusive clade containing Amphizonella, Diplochlamys and Trichosphaerium. It was discovered in 2017 through a phylogenomic study by Senghuo Kang and coauthors, published in the journal Molecular Biology and Evolution. It is supported by independent analyses. As of 2019, it is accepted by the International Society of Protistologists as part of the modern cladistic classification of eukaryotes, although under the alternative spelling Corycida. The name Corycidia is derived from Latin corium 'leathery', referring to the "leathery" test that members of the clade have.

== Evolution ==
Corycidia is located in the eukaryotic supergroup Amoebozoa, specifically inside the clade Tubulinea which unites most lobose amoebae (i.e. amoebae with blunt, thick pseudopodia). It is the most basal tubulinean lineage. The following cladogram depicts the phylogenetic position of Corycidia among other amoebozoan clades.

- Amoebozoa
  - Tubulinea
    - - Echinamoebida
      - Elardia
        - - Arcellinida
          - Euamoebida
        - Leptomyxida
    - - Corycida
        - Trichosida
        - Microcoryciidae
  - - Evosea
    - Discosea

== Classification ==
A total of 7 genera are included within Corycidia, traditionally organized into two families: Trichosphaeriidae (one genus Trichosphaerium), under the monotypic order Trichosida, and Microcoryciidae (six genera), previously assigned to the order Arcellinida. Only three genera are firmly placed in Corycidia through phylogenetic analyses: Amphizonella, Diplochlamys and Trichosphaerium. The position of the genera Penardochlamys, Microcorycia, Zonomyxa and Parmulina, listed as part of the family Microcoryciidae, is not clear. They have been tentatively placed in Corycidia due to a morphological resemblance, but it has not been demonstrated with molecular data.

- Trichosida Möbius, 1889
  - Trichosphaeriidae Sheehan & Banner, 1973
    - Trichosphaerium Schneider, 1878 (=Pontifex, Atrichosa)
- Microcoryciidae de Saedeleer, 1934
  - Amphizonella Greeff, 1866
  - Diplochlamys Greeff, 1888
  - Microcorycia Cockerell, 1911
  - Penardochlamys Deflandre, 1953
  - Zonomyxa Nusslin, 1882
  - Parmulina Penard, 1902
