= Asterotexis =

Scientific classification
- Kingdom: Fungi
- Division: Ascomycota
- Class: Dothideomycetes
- Order: Asterinales
- Family: Asterotexaceae
- Genus: Asterotexis; Arx

Type species
- Asterotexis cucurbitacearum (Rehm) Arx

Genus of fungi

Asterotexis is a genus of fungi in the monotypic family Asterotexaceae.
