= Parmulina =

Scientific classification
- Kingdom: Fungi
- Division: Ascomycota
- Class: Dothideomycetes
- Order: Asterinales
- Family: Parmulariaceae
- Genus: Parmulina; Theiss. & Syd.

Type species
- Parmulina exsculpta (Berk.) Theiss. & Syd.

Genus of fungi

Parmulina is a genus of fungi in the family Parmulariaceae.

== Species ==
- Parmulina asterophora
- Parmulina callista
- Parmulina dimorphospora
- Parmulina exsculpta
- Parmulina japonica
- Parmulina rehmii
- Parmulina stenochlaenae
- Parmulina stigmatopteridis
- Parmulina uleana
