= Parmularia =

Scientific classification
- Domain: Eukaryota
- Kingdom: Fungi
- Division: Ascomycota
- Class: Dothideomycetes
- Order: Asterinales
- Family: Parmulariaceae
- Genus: Parmularia; Lév. (1846)

Type species
- Parmularia styracis Lév. (1846)

Synonyms
- Clypeum Massee (1896); Pycnographa Müll.Arg. (1890); Schneepia Speg. (1885)

Genus of fungi

Parmularia is a genus of fungi in the family Parmulariaceae. The genus was circumscribed by Joseph-Henri Léveillé in 1846.

== Species ==
- Parmularia brouardii B.de Lesd. (1942)
- Parmularia cartilaginea (Ach.) Räsänen (1939)
- Parmularia haenkei (T.Nees) Rehm (1907)
- Parmularia miconiae Inácio & P.F.Cannon (2008)
- Parmularia novomexicana B.de Lesd. (1932)
- Parmularia peltata (Massee) Lindau (1897)
- Parmularia porteae Bat. (1951)
- Parmularia radians (Müll.Arg.) Inácio & P.F.Cannon (2008)
- Parmularia sbarbaronis B.de Lesd. (1932)
- Parmularia styracis Lév. (1846)
- Parmularia uleana Henn. (1898)
- Parmularia vulcanicola B.de Lesd. (1933)
