= Aulacostroma =

Scientific classification
- Kingdom: Fungi
- Division: Ascomycota
- Class: Dothideomycetes
- Order: Asterinales
- Family: Parmulariaceae
- Genus: Aulacostroma; Syd. & P. Syd.

Type species
- Aulacostroma palawanense Syd. & P. Syd.

Species
- A. magnesii A. nigrificans A. osmanthi A. palawanense A. pandani A. parvisporum A. pithyusae

Genus of fungi

Aulacostroma is a genus of fungi in the family Parmulariaceae.
