= Aldonata =

Scientific classification
- Kingdom: Fungi
- Division: Ascomycota
- Class: Dothideomycetes
- Order: Asterinales
- Family: Parmulariaceae
- Genus: Aldonata; Sivan. & A.R.P. Sinha

Type species
- Aldonata pterocarpi Sivan. & A.R.P. Sinha

Genus of fungi

Aldonata is a genus of fungi in the family Parmulariaceae. A monotypic genus, it contains the single species Aldonata pterocarpi.
