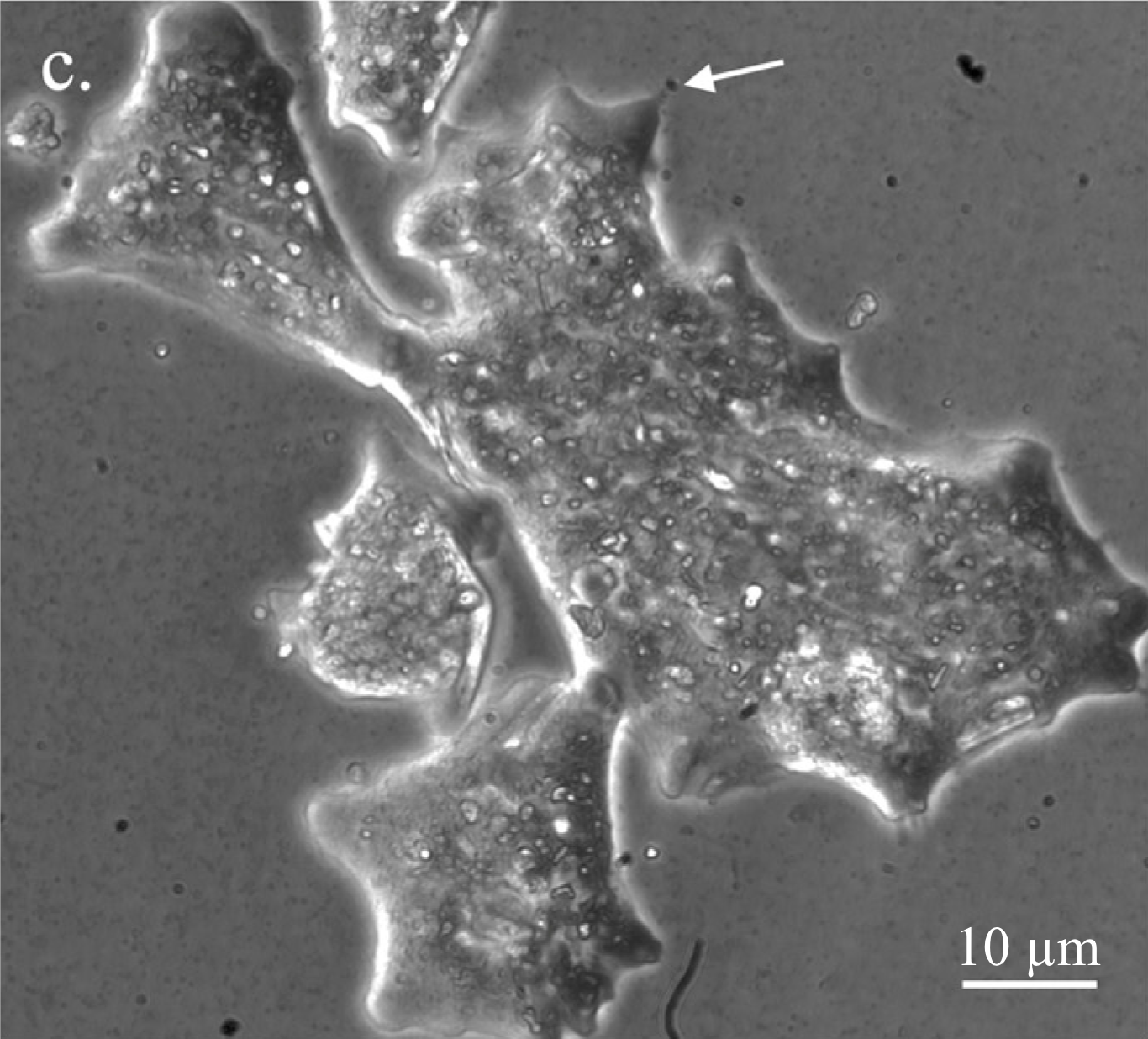
- Trichosphaerium sp. with dactylopodium (arrow)
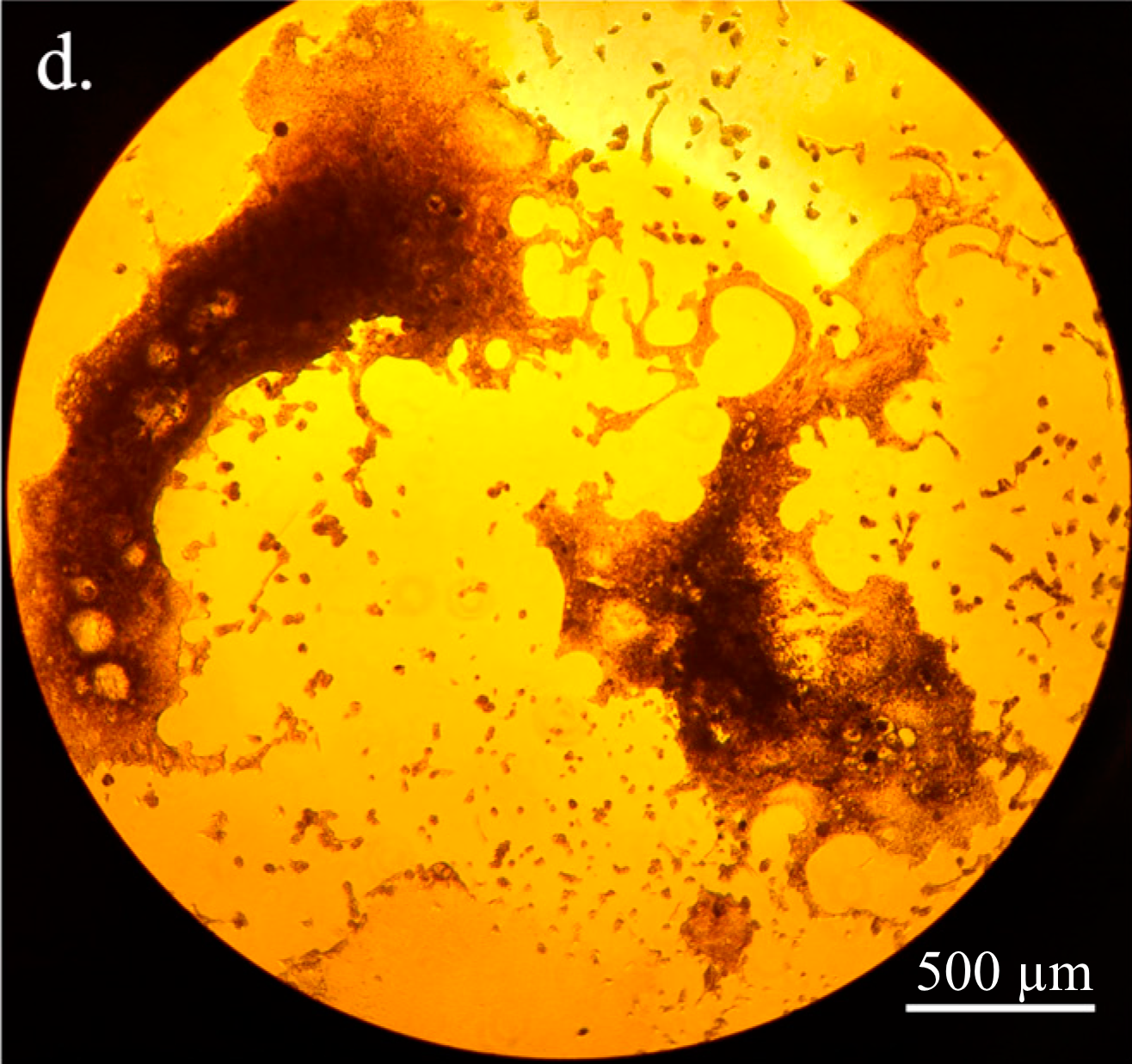
- Trichosphaerium in its giant amoeba form

Scientific classification
- Domain: Eukaryota
- Phylum: Amoebozoa
- Class: Tubulinea
- Clade: Corycidia
- Order: Trichosida; Möbius, 1889
- Family: Trichosphaeriidae; Sheehan & Banner, 1973
- Genus: Trichosphaerium; Schneider, 1878

Synonyms
- Pontifex Schaeffer, 1926; Atrichosa Cavalier-Smith, 2016

= Trichosphaerium =

Genus of amoebae

Trichosphaerium is a genus of amoebozoan protists that present extraordinary morphological transformations, both in size and shape, during their life cycle. They can present a test that may or may not be covered in spicules. They are related to the family Microcoryciidae, which contains other amoebae with tests, within the clade Corycidia of the phylum Amoebozoa.

== Morphology ==
Trichosphaerium is a genus of amoebae characterized from other Amoebozoa by a multiporous test and a specialized non-motile pseudopodium, known as a dactylopodium, shaped like a digit. The dactylopodium is considered a sensory structure. Its morphology, behavior and life cycle are extraordinary in comparison with other protists. During its poorly understood life cycle, Trichosphaerium undergoes dramatic changes in shape and size. They can grow from as small as 10 μm to giant cell sizes of over 1 mm, observable by the naked eye. They can display such varied recognizable morphotypes that they can be easily mistaken with other species of amoebae.

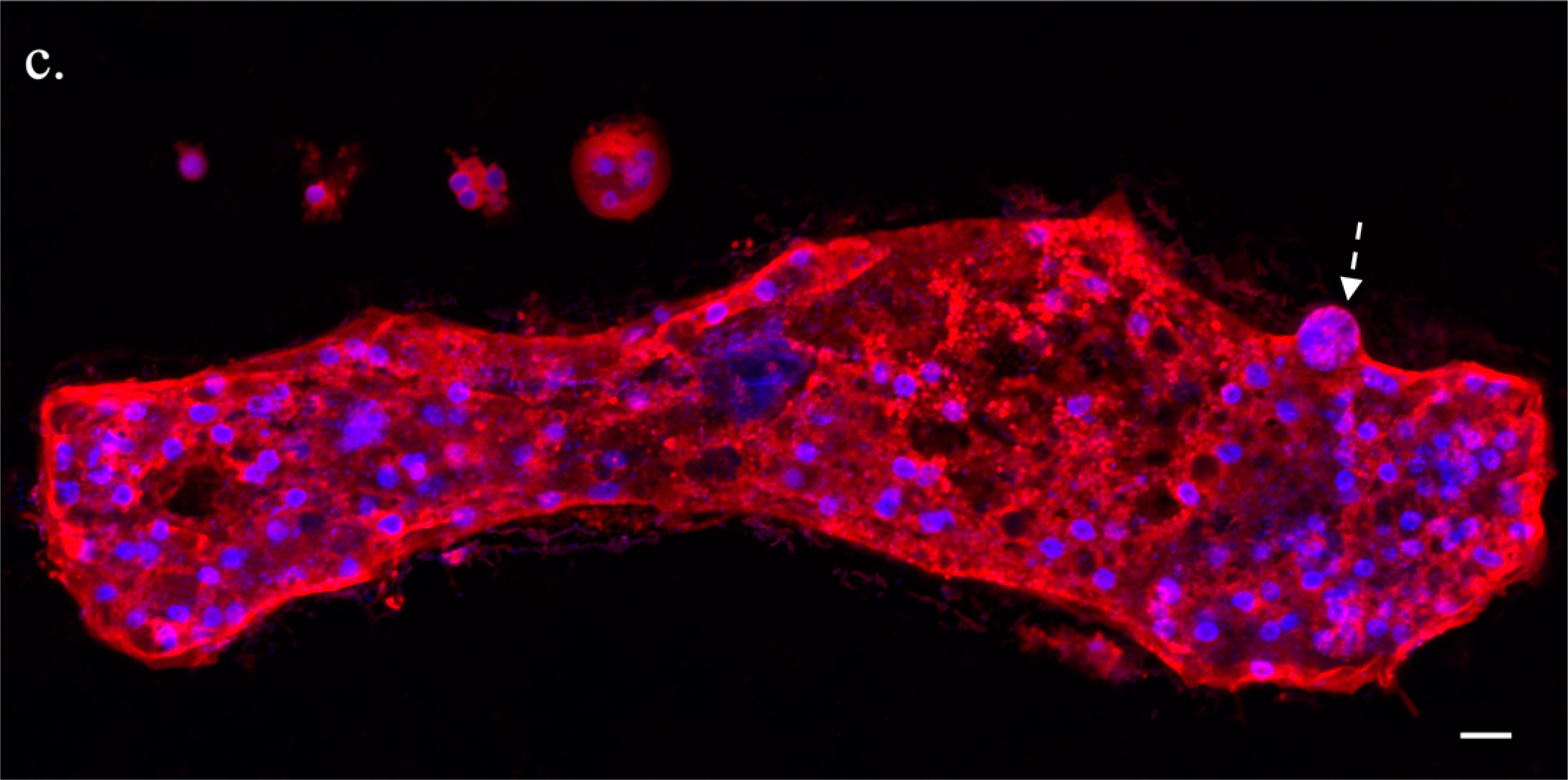
Immunocytochemistry staining of plasma membrane (red) and DNA (blue) of Trichosphaerium, showing various sizes of amoebae including a large amoeba cell with a large (polyploid) nucleus (arrow). Scale bar: 10 μm.

Controversial reports describe an alternation of two trophozoite stages within its life cycle: the "schizont", an amoeba surrounded by a test covered in flexible spicules, and the "gamont", an amoeba surrounded by a more flexible and fibrous test without spicules. According to studies written by German protozoologist Fritz Schaudinn in 1899, the gamont stage produces flagellated gametes, which fuse into a zygote to generate the schizont stage. Although both morphotypes have been observed and kept in laboratory cultures over the decades, this alternation of generations has never been observed in them, which adds a layer of complexity to the unusual, poorly understood behavior of these amoebae.

== Systematics ==
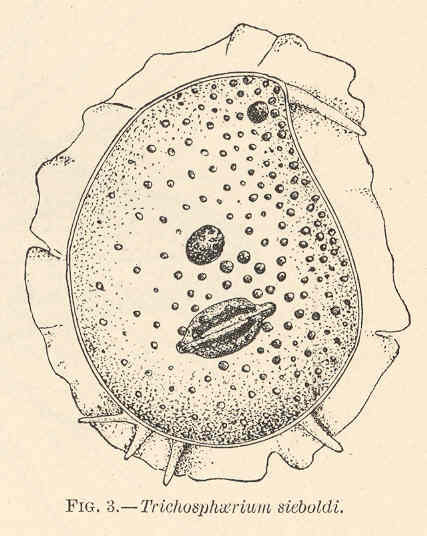
Illustration of T. sieboldi

Trichosphaerium is the sole accepted genus of the family Trichosphaeriidae (sometimes written as Trichosidae) and the order Trichosida. The phylogenetic placement of Trichosphaerium has been controversial, but most recent studies place it within the class Tubulinea of the phylum Amoebozoa. In particular, since 2017, phylogenomic analyses of Amoebozoa recover a clade known as Corycidia, at the base of Tubulinea, containing both Trichosphaerium and amoebae of the family Microcoryciidae together.

=== Synonyms ===
In 2016, American protozoologist Thomas Cavalier-Smith described the genus Atrichosa to comprise an undescribed species of Trichosphaerium, after considering that the type strain of this species does not belong to the genus Trichosphaerium but to a distinct, yet related, organism. This change, however, was not accepted by the 2019 revision of eukaryotic classification, where Atrichosa is considered a junior synonym of Trichosphaerium "until the opposite is shown". Another genus, Pontifex, is considered to be a synonym of Trichosphaerium, although with uncertainty.

=== Species ===
Up to four species have been described within the genus, mainly based on the morphology of the spicules that cover their test.

- Atrichosa algivora Cavalier-Smith, 2016 — described from the only strain of Trichosphaerium that has been genetically sequenced, ATCC 40318. It is not accepted as a separate genus Atrichosa by other authors, but has not been formally merged back into Trichosphaerium.
- Trichosphaerium micrum R.W. Angell, 1975
- Trichosphaerium platyxyrum R.W. Angell, 1976
- Trichosphaerium sieboldi Schneider, 1878
