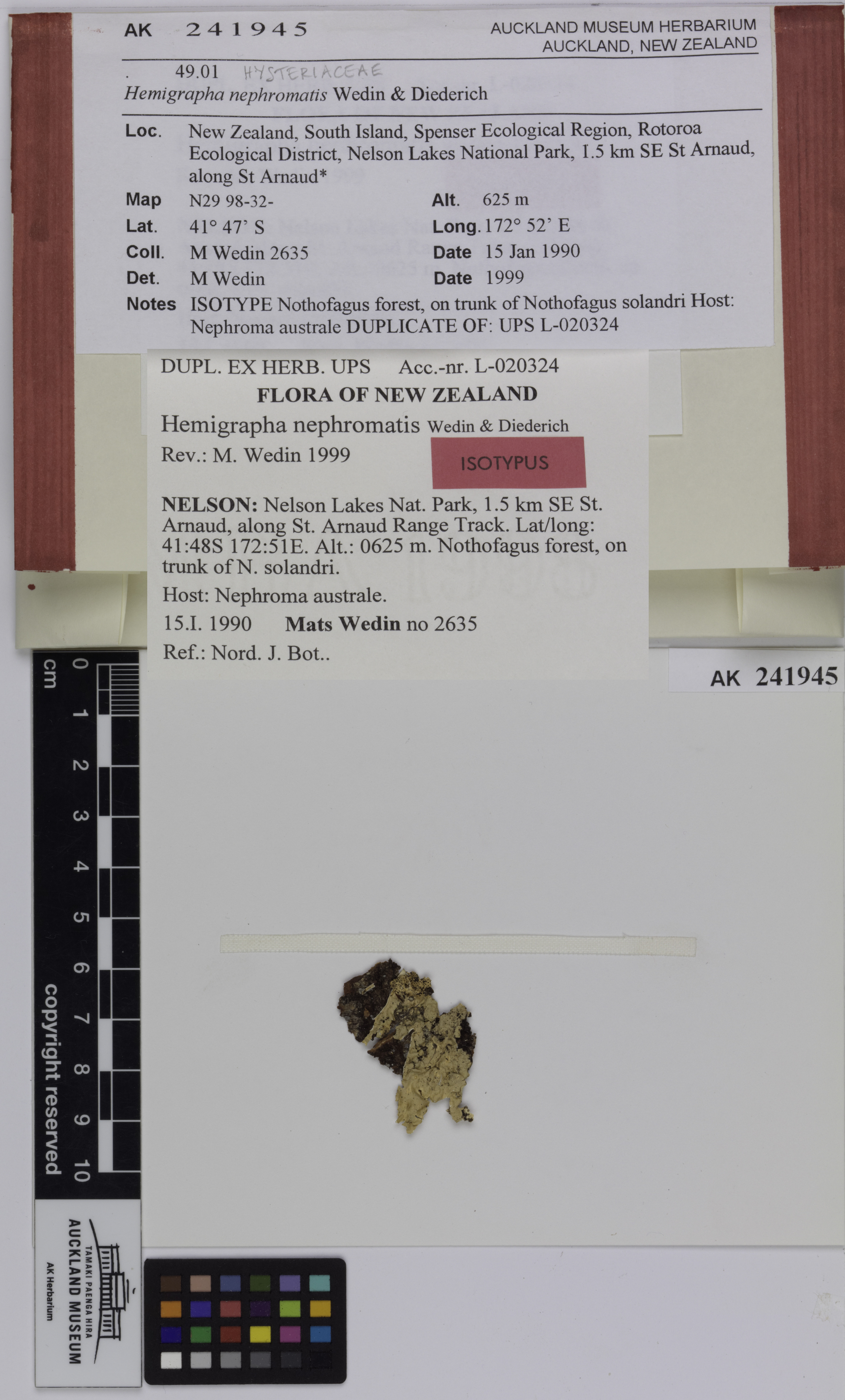
- Hemigrapha nephromatis

Scientific classification
- Kingdom: Fungi
- Division: Ascomycota
- Class: Dothideomycetes
- Order: Asterinales
- Family: Hemigraphaceae
- Genus: Hemigrapha (Müll.Arg.) D.Hawksw. (1975)

Type species
- Hemigrapha asteriscus (Müll.Arg.) R.Sant. ex D.Hawksw. (1975)

Synonyms
- Melanographa sect. Hemigrapha Müll.Arg. (1882)

= Hemigrapha =

Genus of fungi

Hemigrapha is a genus of fungi in the family Hemigraphaceae. The genus was established in 1975 and currently includes nine recognised species. These fungi are parasites that grow on other lichens, producing distinctive flat, star-shaped or elongated black fruiting bodies on their host's surface.

== Description ==
Hemigrapha lacks its own thallus and instead parasitises other lichens. Its reproductive structures are flat, superficial fruiting bodies called thyriothecia. When young these appear black, round, star-shaped or elongate, and may branch or fuse together. Each thyriothecium is surrounded by a single layer of dark-brown, short rectangular cells arranged like spokes of a wheel; the covering breaks open irregularly, leaving the spore-bearing surface (hymenium) partly exposed while any true pore (ostiole) is often hard to discern. The hymenium does not stain blue in iodine tests. Threads known as paraphysoids weave through the asci; they branch only sparingly, sometimes fuse, and in mature fruiting bodies their tips separate and become slightly swollen and brown. Short, few-celled hairs (periphyses) arise from the inner wall.

The asci are thick-walled, double-layered (fissitunicate), club-shaped to almost spherical, and carry a distinct ocular chamber at the apex; they do not stain in iodine and usually contain between four and eight ascospores, though two-spored asci also occur. Ascospores develop one to three internal walls (septa), are clearly pinched at each septum, and change from colourless to pale brown as they mature. Initially smooth, they become finely granular or even warted in over-mature specimens; they possess no surrounding perispore. Asexual reproduction takes place in structures (pycnothyria) that are intermixed with, and macroscopically indistinguishable from, the thyriothecia. These lack conidiophores; instead, bottle-shaped conidiogenous cells emerge directly from the wall and produce two sizes of smooth, colourless, single-celled spores: narrowly ellipsoidal to rod-shaped microconidia and larger ellipsoidal macroconidia.

== Species ==
As of July 2025, Species Fungorum (in the Catalogue of Life) accept nine species of Hemigrapha:

- Hemigrapha asteriscus (Müll.Arg.) R.Sant. ex D.Hawksw. (1975)
- Hemigrapha atlantica Diederich & Wedin (2000)
- Hemigrapha graphidicola Diederich & Common (2019)
- Hemigrapha nephromatis Wedin & Diederich (2000)
- Hemigrapha phaeospora Matzer & Lücking (1996)
- Hemigrapha pilocarpacearum M.Cáceres & Lücking (2000)
- Hemigrapha pseudocyphellariae Diederich & Wedin (2000)
- Hemigrapha strigulae Matzer (1996)
- Hemigrapha tenellula (Müll.Arg.) R.Sant. ex Matzer (1996)
