= Asterinales =

Scientific classification
- Domain: Eukaryota
- Kingdom: Fungi
- Division: Ascomycota
- Class: Dothideomycetes
- Order: Asterinales; M.E. Barr ex D. Hawksw. & O.E. Erikss.

Family
- See text

Synonyms
- Asterotexales Firmino

Order of fungi

Asterinales is an order of fungi in the class Dothideomycetes. It contains ten families according to the 2021 work "Outline of Fungi and fungus-like taxa", each of which is listed with the number of genera it contains:

- Asterinaceae (18)
- Asterotexaceae (1)
- Cylindrohyalosporaceae (1)
- Hemigraphaceae (1)
- Lembosiaceae (2)
- Melaspileellaceae (1)
- Morenoinaceae (1)
- Neobueliellaceae (1)
- Oblongohyalosporaceae (1)
- Stictographaceae (5)
