= Arcella (disambiguation) =

Arcella is a genus of testate amoebae in the Arcellinidan order.

It may also refer to:

- Arcella hemisphaerica, an amoeboid species
- Fabio Arcella (died 1560), Italian Roman Catholic prelate
- Arcella (Padua), a district in Padua, Italy
  - Sanctuary of Arcella, Padua, a Roman Catholic church located in the district
- San Nicola Arcella, a town and comune in Cosenza, Calabria, Italy
