= Sanctuary of Arcella, Padua =

Coordinates: 45°25′18.06″N 11°53′10.97″E

Sanctuary of Arcella
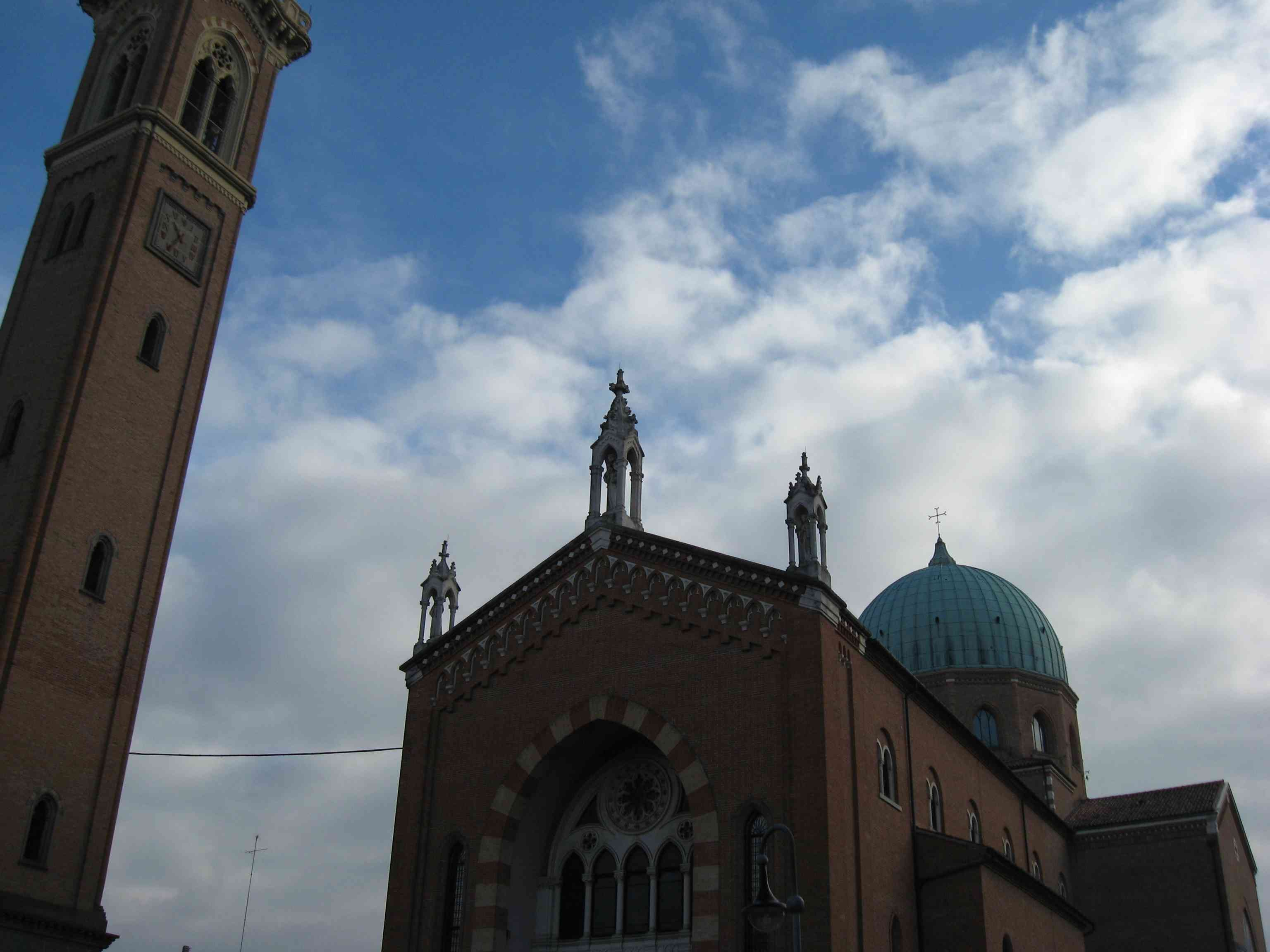
- Sanctuary of Arcella
- Location: Padua, Italy

The Sanctuary of Arcella (Italian: Santuario dell'Arcella), popularly known as Sant'Antonino, is a Roman Catholic church located in the neighborhood of Arcella, in the north of Padua, region of Veneto, Italy. The sanctuary preserves the room in which St Anthony of Padua died on June 13, 1231. Today it also serves as a parish church, ministered by monks of the Franciscan order.

== History ==
Although the Gothic Revival church building is relatively new and completed in 1931 using designs by Eugenio Maestri, worship at the site has medieval roots. Today the Sanctuary is still run by the Friars Minor Conventual, and enjoys the title of parish church.

In the early 13th-century, the site hosted a hospice, staffed by a group of Clarissan nuns, which had been established by St Francis of Assisi himself in 1227. During this time, the hospice was some distance outside the city walls of medieval Padua.

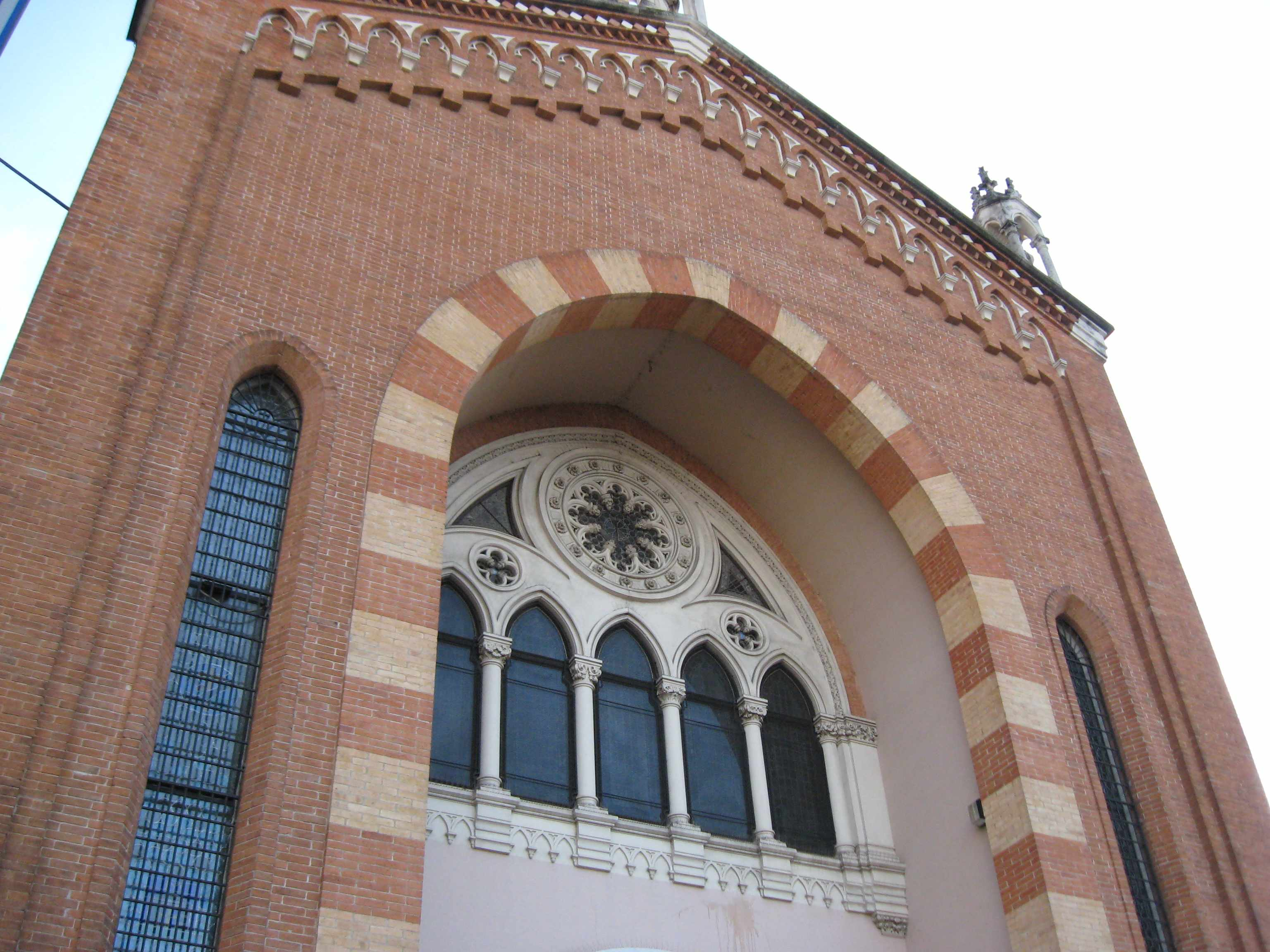
Closer view of the facade

On June 13, 1231, en route to Padua, Antonio, a follower of St Francis, fell ill and died on this site. The room in which he died became a site of devotion. Putatively in the same year, the Poor Clare nun, Elena Enselmini died and her remains have since also been kept in this sanctuary; she was beatified in 1695. Over the centuries, the structures at the site were enlarged. In 1506, the Church of the Blessed Elena was built to house the body of Enselmini and attached to a Clarissan monastery. The new church was also built around St Anthony's cell.

The present Sanctuary was designed under the patronage of Paduan Giovanni Battista Trevisan: his project rebuilt or enlarged the previous construction completed in 1842 in Neoclassical style. It was characterized by the imposing Corinthian portico raised on a high basement and twin bell towers, which flanked the narrow nave. The neo-Gothic sanctuary was designed (1890) by Eugenio Maestri as an extension of the previous building. The interior was completely painted in tempera by Giacomo Manzoni in collaboration with Agis Aschieri. Construction lasted till 1931 with the aid of Nino Gallimberti and Agostino Zanovello.
