= Stefan Michel =

Swiss management professor

Stefan Michel is a Swiss professor of management at IMD in Lausanne, Switzerland, where he serves as Dean of Faculty and Research.

== Early life and education ==
Michel earned an MBA and a doctorate from the University of Zurich, both summa cum laude. He received the Best Dissertation Award from the Swiss Society for Market and Social Research in 1997.

== Career ==
Michel was a tenured associate professor of Global Marketing at Thunderbird School of Global Management in Arizona, United States. In 2008, he joined IMD as Professor of Marketing and Service Management. He served as Dean of the IMD Executive MBA program from 2014 to 2022 and was then appointed Dean of Faculty and Research.

From 2011 to 2023, he was a non-executive member of the board of directors of Bossard Holding AG (SIX Swiss Exchange), where he served on the compensation committee. He is President of the Foundation Board of the GfM Gesellschaft für Marketing (Swiss Marketing Association).

== Research and publications ==
Michel has published in the Harvard Business Review, MIT Sloan Management Review, California Management Review, and the Journal of the Academy of Marketing Science. His Harvard Business Review article "Capture More Value" (October 2014) presented a framework of 15 value-capture strategies. In 2024, he discussed the topic on the HBR On Strategy podcast.

He co-authored "Bill It, Kill It, or Keep It Free?" with Wolfgang Ulaga in the MIT Sloan Management Review (2018), and "Service-Logic Innovations: How to Innovate Customers, Not Products" with Stephen W. Brown and Andrew S. Gallan in the California Management Review (2008).

Michel has authored 13 books, including Real Impact Marketing (3rd edition, 2022) with Lisa S. Duke, and edits the I by IMD Best Practice book series. He has written more than 40 case studies and has been ranked in The Case Centre's top 50 bestselling case authors from 2020/21 through 2024/25. In 2025, he won The Case Centre's Outstanding Case Writer competition for "AMAG: Creating Its Own Future in a Disrupted Automotive Industry."

== Awards and honours ==
- Best Dissertation Award, Swiss Society for Market and Social Research, 1997.
- Best Paper Award in Marketing Strategy, American Marketing Association Winter Educators' Conference, 2005.
- Best Paper Award, 10th Research Seminar in Services Management, La Londe, 2008.
- Emerald Literati Award for Best Paper of the Year, Journal of Service Management, 2009 and 2010.
- John Molson MBA International Case Writing Competition prize, 2017.
- John Molson MBA International Case Writing Competition, second prize, 2024.
- Outstanding Case Writer Prize, The Case Centre, 2025.

== Bibliography ==
=== Books ===
- Marketing: Eine praxisorientierte Einführung mit zahlreichen Beispielen (with Karin Oberholzer Michel, 2006; 8th edition 2020) ISBN 978-3715598857
- Real Impact Marketing: Create a 1-Page Marketing Plan with Better Customer Insights (with Lisa S. Duke, 2014; 3rd edition 2022) ISBN 978-3907311035
- I by IMD's Best Practice in Leadership (editor, 2025) ISBN 978-2940485819
- I by IMD's Best Practice in Strategy (editor, with Michael Watkins, 2025) ISBN 978-2940485833
- I by IMD's Best Practice in Sustainable Business Transformation (editor, with Julia Binder, 2025) ISBN 978-2940485857
- I by IMD's Best Practice in Governance (editor, 2025) ISBN 978-2940485871

=== Selected articles ===
- Michel, S. (2001). "Analyzing service failures and recoveries: a process approach". International Journal of Service Industry Management, 12(1), 20–33.
- Michel, S., Brown, S. W., & Gallan, A. S. (2008). "An expanded and strategic view of discontinuous innovations: deploying a service-dominant logic". Journal of the Academy of Marketing Science, 36(1), 54–66.
- Michel, S., Brown, S. W., & Gallan, A. S. (2008). "Service-Logic Innovations: How to Innovate Customers, Not Products". California Management Review, 50(3), 49–65.
- Michel, S., Vargo, S. L., & Lusch, R. F. (2008). "Reconfiguration of the conceptual landscape: a tribute to the service logic of Richard Normann". Journal of the Academy of Marketing Science, 36(1), 152–155.
- Michel, S., Bowen, D., & Johnston, R. (2009). "Why service recovery fails: Tensions among customer, employee, and process perspectives". Journal of Service Management, 20(3), 253–273.
- Rubalcaba, L., Michel, S., Sundbo, J., Brown, S. W., & Reynoso, J. (2012). "Shaping, organizing, and rethinking service innovation: a multidimensional framework". Journal of Service Management, 23(5), 696–715.
- Michel, S. (2014). "Capture More Value". Harvard Business Review, October 2014.
- Michel, S. & Ulaga, W. (2018). "Bill It, Kill It, or Keep It Free?". MIT Sloan Management Review, 60(1).
