= Piskorski =

Polish surname

Piskorski is a Polish surname. Notable people with the surname include:

- Krzysztof Piskorski (born 1982), Polish writer
- Mateusz Piskorski (born 1977), Polish far-right politician
- Mikolaj Piskorski (born 1973), Polish academic
- Paweł Piskorski (born 1968), Polish politician; mayor of Warsaw
- Ronald F. Piskorski (born 1949), American Donna Lee Bakery murders perpetrator
