= Predictable surprise =

A "predictable surprise" describes a situation or circumstance in which avoidable crises are marginalized in order to satisfy economic and social policies.

== Definition ==
Max H. Bazerman and Michael D. Watkins define "predictable surprises" as problems that

- at least some people are aware of,
- are getting worse over time, and
- are likely to explode into a crisis eventually,
- but are not prioritized by key decision-makers or have not elicited a response fast enough to prevent severe damage.

The problems behind "predictable surprises" tend to require a significant investment in the near term that will not pay off until later. This could involve changes to established organization culture and/or changes that competing interests do not benefit from.

== Examples of predictable surprises ==
- Iraq War
- Enron scandal
- Subprime mortgage crisis
- Hurricane Katrina government response
- Global warming
- Roman Catholic sex abuse cases
