= Howard Yu =

Hong Kong professor

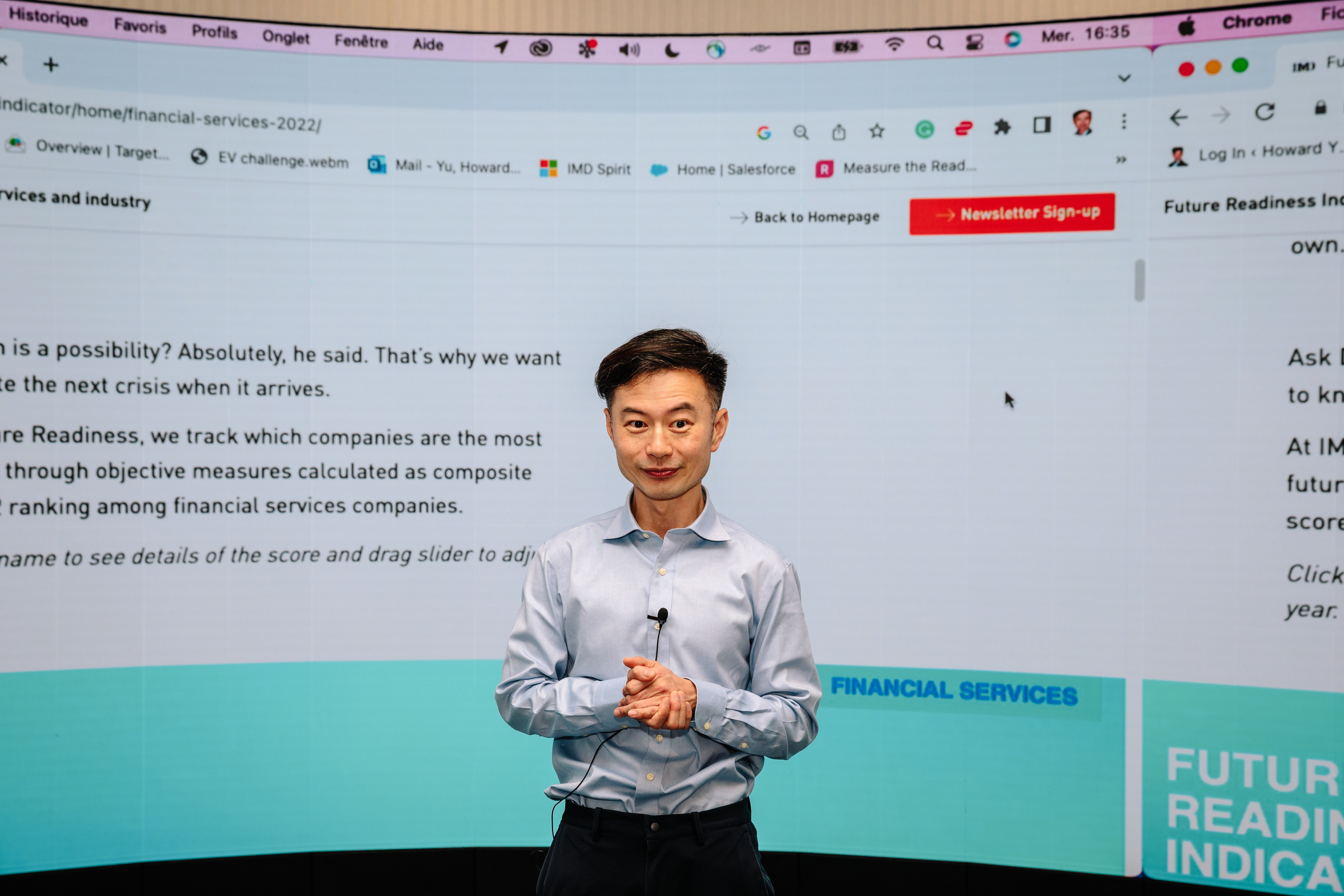
- Howard Yu in 2022
- Born: Hong Kong
- Occupation: Professor
- Known for: Future Readiness Indicator

Academic background
- Education: University of Hong Kong; Harvard Business School
- Academic advisors: Clayton Christensen and Joseph Bower

Academic work
- Discipline: Management and innovation
- Notable works: Taiwan's PC Industry, 1976–2010: The Evolution of Organizational Capabilities; Leap: How to Thrive in a World Where Everything Can be Copied
- Website: howardyu.org

Howard Yu is a Hong Kong-born academic and author who is the LEGO professor of management and innovation at IMD Business School. He is also the director of Advanced Management Program and Future Readiness Strategy open program of IMD and a Research Affiliate at MIT.

Yu is the author of the book, Leap and was the recipient of the Thinkers50 Strategy Award in 2023.

== Early life and education ==
Yu was born in Hong Kong. He earned a Bachelor of Business Administration from the University of Hong Kong in 2001. Before pursuing his doctorate, Yu worked in the banking industry in Hong Kong and earned a Doctor of Business Administration in general management from Harvard Business School in 2011. His doctoral research was supervised by Clayton Christensen and Joseph Bower, and it focused on disruptive innovation.

== Academic career ==
Yu joined the faculty of IMD Business School in 2011. In 2017, Yu was appointed director of the Advanced Management Program, and he co-directs the Strategy for Future Readiness program alongside the Future-Ready Enterprise initiative. In 2020, Yu became the director of the IMD Center for Future Readiness, which was established with the help of The LEGO Group.

In 2021, Yu led the development of the Future Readiness Indicator, a rule-based methodology that uses publicly available data to assess organizational resilience.

In May 2025, MIT Sloan Executive Education and IMD jointly launched the Future Ready Enterprise Academy, a two-module executive education program delivered at MIT in Cambridge, Massachusetts and at IMD in Singapore. Yu serves as faculty for the program alongside IMD colleague Mark Greeven.

As of 2026, Howard is the LEGO professor of management and innovation at the IMD Business School.

== Writing ==
In June 2018, Yu published Leap: How to Thrive in a World Where Everything Can Be Copied, which received a Gold Medal at the 2019 Axiom Business Book Awards and was named among the best business books of the year by Inc. and Strategy+Business. The book was published by PublicAffairs, New York, an imprint of Hachette Book Group. It was also selected as an FT Business Book of the Month in the same month of 2018.

== Research ==
His research focuses on the dynamics of innovation and sustainable growth, specifically examining how organizations build capabilities to navigate technological disruption and commoditization. A theme of his scholarship is the "leap" strategy, which details how firms can jump to new knowledge frontiers to maintain a competitive advantage over imitators. His research also focuses on Asian economies.

His recent work includes Future Readiness Indicators for several industries to gauge industry incumbents' preparedness.

== Bibliography ==
- Yu, Howard H.; Shih, Willy C. (2018). Taiwan's PC Industry, 1976–2010: The Evolution of Organizational Capabilities.
- Yu, Howard (2018). Leap: How to Thrive in a World Where Everything Can be Copied
- Yu, Howard (2018). Leap: How to Thrive in a World Where Everything Can Be Copied. PublicAffairs. ISBN 978-1610397609.

== Honors and awards ==
Yu is recipient of the Thinkers50 Strategy Award in 2023 and the 2015 Poets & Quants "Top 40 Business Professors Under 40" ranking. He was also included in the Thinkers50 Ranking of the world’s top management thinkers in both 2023 and 2025. He has also received multiple EFMD Gold Awards and Case Centre accolades for his research on digital transformation and organizational development.
