= Il Mondo Illustrato =

Italian weekly magazine, 1847–1861

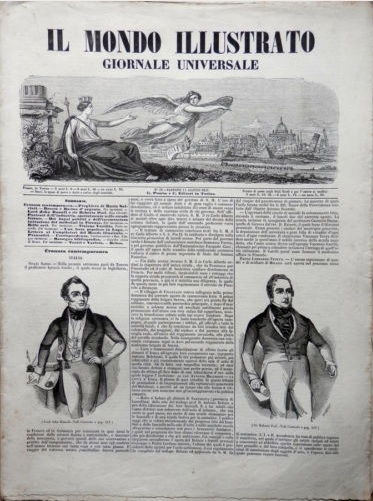
- Front-page of the magazine's first issue (2 January 1847)
- Type: Weekly
- Format: Broadsheet news magazine
- Owner(s): Giuseppe Pompa & Co.
- Founded: 1847
- Ceased publication: 1861
- Political alignment: Conservative
- Headquarters: Turin, Kingdom of Sardinia

Il Mondo Illustrato was an illustrated periodical founded in Turin in 1847. It was the first Italian illustrated newspaper. Published weekly in Turin by the publishing house Giuseppe Pompa & Co., it ran until 1861. Aimed at a relatively broad audience, it covered a wide range of topics including history, geography, art, current affairs, literature and politics.

== History ==
Il Mondo Illustrato was founded in Turin by the editor and typographer Giuseppe Pomba. Pomba was no stranger to magazine publishing; from 1834 to 1848 he had produced the weekly Il Teatro Universale, an Italian version of the Penny Magazine. Like its predecessor, Il Mondo Illustrato drew inspiration from an English model: the weekly news magazine Illustrated London News, founded in London in 1842. The first issue was published on Saturday, 2 January 1847. The annual subscription fee was 30 lire for Turin residents and 32 lire for non-residents, a relatively small amount for the period.

The magazine adopted a clear nationalist editorial stance. Its first director, the journalist and politician Giuseppe Massari (1821–1884), was a prominent member of the Historical Right with close ties to the Count of Cavour. Contributors included Cesare Balbo, Cesare Cantù, Ruggero Bonghi, and Carlo Matteucci. In 1848, the magazine reached its peak subscriber base of over 3,000. Despite the aspiration to reach the entire Italian market, however, the magazine's circulation remained mainly limited to the Kingdom of Sardinia. Its nationalist tendencies hindered the its diffusion, prompting bans in the Kingdom of Lombardy–Venetia, the Papal States, and the Kingdom of Kingdom of the Two Sicilies. Nevertheless, Il Mondo Illustrato was somewhat popular in Austrian-occupied Italy, particularly in Milan, Padua and Vicenza, where, according to an Austrian police report, it had around 300 subscribers.

Despite its relative success, Pomba's publishing project soon ran into financial difficulties. The publisher had estimated that a print run of at least 10,000 copies would be necessary to sustain the huge production costs. This goal, however, was never achieved. By the end of 1847, the lack of shareholders was threatening the continuity of the publication, and the situation worsened at the beginning of 1849 when Il Mondo Illustrato was forced to cease operations.

Publication resumed in July 1860, still under the guidance of publisher Pomba. The direction of the magazine was entrusted to Guglielmo Stefani, the founder of the press agency Agenzia Stefani. Over the next two years, the magazine evolved: the illustrations became more elaborate, improving the visual quality and addressing the shortcomings identified in the initial phase. However, increased competition from other publications, rising production costs and political and social changes following the unification of Italy soon caused the magazine to enter a period of crisis. Il Mondo Illustrato closed permanently in December 1861.

== Bibliography ==
- Palazzolo, Maria Iolanda (2015). "POMBA, Giuseppe". Dizionario Biografico degli Italiani (in Italian). Vol. 84: Piovene–Ponzo. Rome: Institute of the Italian Encyclopaedia. ISBN 978-88-12-00032-6.
- Tunzi, Pasquale (2023). "La metamorfosi comunicativa con "Il Mondo Illustrato Giornale Universale" (1847–1861)". In M. Cannella; A. Garozzo; S. Morena (eds.). Transizioni Transitions. Attraversare Modulare Procedere. Milan: Franco Angeli. pp. 646–661. ISBN 978-8835155119.
