= UTET =

Unione Tipografico-Editrice Torinese
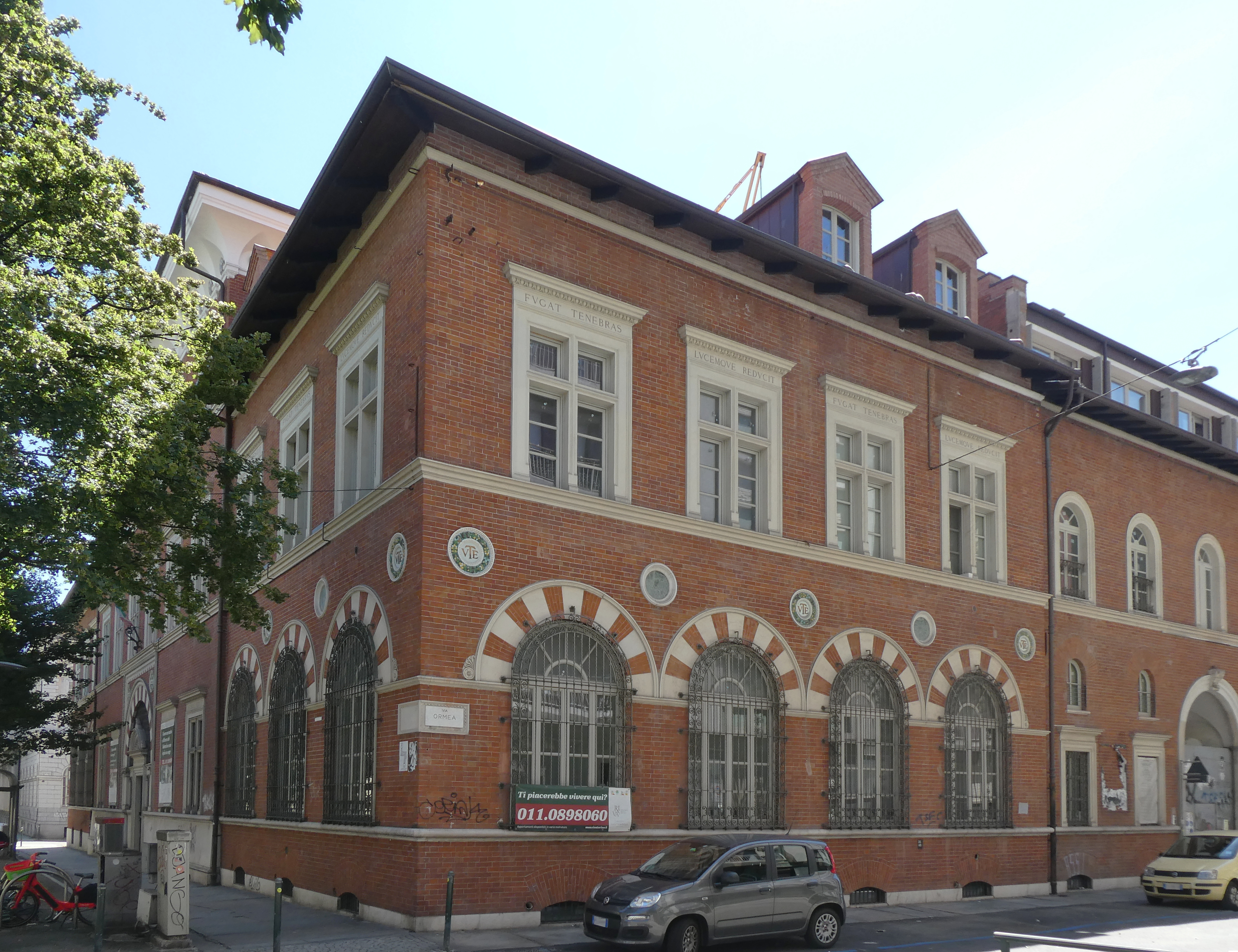
- Headquarters in corso Raffaello, 28, Turin
- Type: Private
- Industry: Publishing
- Founded: 1791; 235 years ago in Turin, Italy
- Headquarters: Italy
- Area served: Italy; Europe

UTET (Unione Tipografico-Editrice Torinese) is a Turin-based Italian publishing house, its roots are traced back to 1791. Giuseppe Pomba managed the enterprise in 1809-1849, he turned a small local publisher into a company of nation-wide influence. The name UTET was registered in 1854 by his successors. In the 19th century, the publishing house was one of the most important in Italy and had a significant cultural impact.

In 2021, UTET became a part of Mondadori Group when it purchased De Agostini Libri.

== History ==
=== Foundation ===
The publishing house was founded in Turin in 1791 by bookshop owner Giovanni Pomba and his brother. In 1809, Giovanni's 14-years old son Giuseppe Pomba (1795–1876) inherited the business. In 1814, purchased a small typing facility, in 1831, he registered a publishing and printing company. Under his leadership, the publishing house grew into a nationally renowned company. The linguist and scholar Michele Giocondi calls Pomba ‘the greatest, most influential, innovative and longest-serving <Italian> editor of the first half of the XIXth century’. In 1820, he launched Collezione dei classici latini, a series dedicated to works of Latin authors. The next series was Biblioteca popolare, a collection of affordable books around 200 pages long that offered the best works of Italian writers from Dante to Manzoni. Some titles reached a print run over 10,000 copies. The collection became an important cultural tool that has brought together different social classes in a deeply divided country. In the 30s, when the political situation in Italy worsened, Pomba was arrested and spent a month in jail for publishing L'assedio di Firenze by Domenico Guerrazzi. In prison, he invented his next great project: publishing Storia Universale, a monumental work of 35 volumes edited by Cesare Cantù.

Giuseppe Pomba retired in 1849, his company was acquired by Ditta Cugini Pomba e C., managed by his cousins. On the basis of their company, UTET was registered in 1854.

=== XX century ===
The house was managed by Giuseppe Luigi Pomba from 1892 to 1929.

In 1900, UTET moved to its current location in corso Raffaello, 28.

In 1945 Carlo Verde succeeded Vincenzo Gitti as the director.

In 1961, UTET launched another ambitious project: Il Grande dizionario della lingua italiana edited by Salvatore Battaglia. The Great Dictionary of the Italian Language was published between 1961 and 2002; it comprises more than 22,000 pages in 21 volumes.

By 1948, UTET had a catalogue of over 600 titles.

Building on a tradition of specialized publishing dating back to the mid-19th century, UTET also held a prominent position in the legal sector (specialized journals, collections of laws and commentaries, university textbooks, and digital publishing) as well as in the fields of medicine and technical sciences. At the turn of the 1980s and 1990s, the publishing house experienced a period of rapid expansion. In 1985, the subsidiary UTET Libreria was established, and in 1988, UTET Periodici Scientific was founded.

In 1990, UTET acquired Petrini Editore. Five years later, it took over Garzanti publishing house.

=== XXI century ===
UTET was acquired by De Agostini in 2002. Utet Grandi Opere was declared bankrupt in 2020 amidst the Covid-19 pandemic.

In 2023, the publishing house moved headquarters to Segrate and launched the new collection of pocket-books. Alberi sapienti, antiche foreste by Daniele Zovi became the first title of the series.

== Literature ==
- Giocondi, Michele (2018). Breve storia dell’editoria italiana (1861-2018) con 110 schede monografiche. goWare. ISBN 9788833631196.
