= Manzoni =

Manzoni is an Italian surname, and may refer to:

== People ==
=== Academics ===
- Antonio Manzoni (1746–1819), Italian surgeon and anatomist from Verona
- Jean-Francois Manzoni (born 1961), French and Canadian academic, Dean of the International Institute for Management Development
- Luigi Manzoni, Italian professor and grape breeder who created the Incrocio Manzoni family of grapes

=== Arts ===
- Alessandro Manzoni (1785–1873), Italian philosopher, poet, playwright, and novelist
- Giacomo Manzoni (composer) (born 1932), Italian composer
- Giacomo Manzoni (1840–1912), Italian painter, active and exhibiting in the Veneto
- Giuseppe Manzoni (1742–1811), Italian writer and priest from Venice
- Ignazio Manzoni (1797–1884), Italian painter, active for many years in Buenos Aires
- Piero Manzoni (1933–1963), Italian artist
- Ridolfo Manzoni (1675–1745), Italian still-life painter from Castelfranco

=== Sports ===
- Alberto Manzoni (born 2005), Italian footballer
- Alessio Manzoni (born 1987), Italian footballer
- Diego Manzoni (born 1990), Italian former footballer
- Edoardo Manzoni (born 1947), Italian footballer
- Giancarlo Manzoni (1938–2013), Italian cyclist
- Gloria Manzoni (born 1998), Italian road and track cyclist
- Mario Manzoni (born 1969), Italian former professional racing cyclist
- Sven Manzoni (born 1987), Croatian ice hockey player

=== Others ===
- Cherubino Manzoni O.F.M. (1595–1651), Roman Catholic prelate who served as Bishop of Termoli
- Flavio Manzoni (born 1965), Italian architect and automobile designer
- Herbert Manzoni (1899–1972), British civil engineer and city planner
- Jean-Francois Manzoni (born 1961), French Canadian academic
- John Manzoni (born 1960), British bureaucrat and executive
- Pablo Manzoni (c. 1940–2022), Italian make-up artist

== See also ==
- 14103 Manzoni, a minor planet discovered by P. Sicoli and A. Testa in Sormano
- Manzoni – Museo della Liberazione (Rome Metro), station on the Rome Metro
- Casa Manzoni, historical house in Milan
- Teatro Manzoni, theatre in Milan
- Via Manzoni, street in Milan
- USS Lydia (ID-3524), a cargo ship that in 1924 was renamed Manzoni.
