= Helen Enselmini =

- Born: 1208; Padua, Italy
- Died: November 4th, 1242
- Beatified: 1695 by Pope Innocent XII
- Major shrine: Sanctuary of Arcella, Padua

Helen Enselmini (Italian: Elena Enselmini), also known as the Blessed Helen of Arcella (1208–1242), was an Italian Franciscan nun who has been beatified by the Catholic Church.

== Life ==
Enselmini was born in Padua, from an impoverished noble family of the region. About 1220, Francis of Assisi, recently returned from the Middle East, went to that city to supervise the opening of a monastery of Poor Clares on land donated in the nearby village of Arcella, to which was attached a small friary of the Friars Minor he had founded. Moved by a sermon she heard him give on the streets of Padua, Enselmini was inspired to become a Poor Clare at the age of 12, according to tradition receiving the religious habit from Francis himself.

Although she was always in frail health, Enselmini spent the rest of her life living the full rigor of the Rule of St. Clare, including frequent fasting, poverty of life and manual labor, without complaint. She was said to have had the gift of inedia, living solely off the Blessed Sacrament for months. Her health declined severely later in life, however, and she became both blind and mute in her last years, which she accepted with patience. She is said to have been advised and comforted during this period by Anthony of Padua. She died on November 4th 1242 of natural causes.

== Veneration ==
After her death, Enselmini was honored as a saint by Franciscan Order as well as by the people of Padua and the surrounding region. Her body was described as still lifelike for a considerable period and miracles were reported by visitors to her tomb. A century later, Giusto de' Menabuoi included her in his mural of the patron saints of the city in the baptistry of the Cathedral of Padua. In the 15th century, the monastery was re-dedicated to her as the Monastery of St. Helen outside the Walls, with an indulgence granted by Pope Eugene IV in 1443 to all those who contributed to its rebuilding.

In 1693 a delegation representing the Order of Friars Minor Conventual, as well as Gregory Barbarigo, the Bishop of Padua, and various other Church authorities, went to Rome to seek Enselmini's beatification. She was beatified on 29 October 1695 by Pope Leo X, later confirmed by Pope Innocent XII.

Today her remains are encased in a glass coffin in the Sanctuary of Arcella, now part of the City of Padua.
