= Giacomo Manzoni =

Giacomo Manzoni may refer to:

- Giacomo Manzoni (composer), Italian composer
- Giacomo Manzoni (painter), Italian painter
- Giacomo Manzoni, known professionally as Giacomo Manzù, Italian sculptor
