= Ian Charles Stewart =

New Zealand businessman

- Born: 1958 (age 67–68)
- Education: MBA
- Alma mater: I.M.D.
- Known for: Wired, Artworld Salon
- Website: LinkedIn profile

Ian Charles Stewart is an entrepreneur, and the co-founder of Wired magazine and Artworld Salon. Interested in the financial aspects of international art, he has an MBA from the International Institute for Management Development. He has lived in Beijing, China since 2006 and is currently the Chairman of Khunu and the Chairman of Wheels Plus Wings, a social venture focused on helping children with physical disabilities. He was previously the Executive Chairman of The PAE Group.

== Athletic career ==
He was a member of the New Zealand Olympic volleyball team. From 2008 to 2011, he was Team Principal of China's America's Cup Sailing Team.

== Photography ==
He is a published photographer, and the author of a book of photo essays about the islands of Indonesia, as well as a book about the architecture of Singapore.
