= José Parra Moyano =

Spanish academic

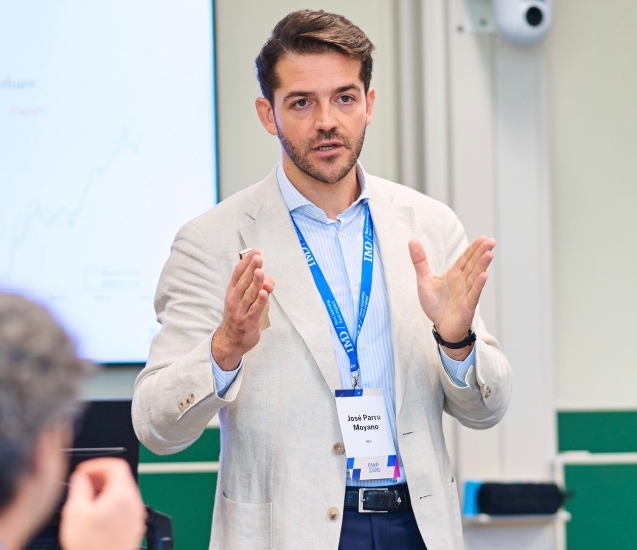
- Education: University of Zurich
- Known for: Research on artificial intelligence and digital transformation
- Scientific career
- Fields: Digital strategy, artificial intelligence, data analytics
- Workplaces: IMD Business School

José Parra Moyano is a Spanish academic and researcher specializing in digital strategy, artificial intelligence, and data analytics. He is a professor of digital strategy at IMD Business School in Switzerland.

== Education ==
Parra Moyano earned a Doctor of Philosophy (PhD) in Management and Economics from the University of Zurich.

== Early life and education ==
Parra Moyano serves as Professor of Digital Strategy at IMD Business School, where he teaches and conducts research on the impact of digital technologies on organizations and economic systems.

His research examines how organizations adopt and integrate emerging technologies, particularly artificial intelligence, and how leadership decisions influence digital transformation outcomes.

Parra Moyano has also held teaching roles and guest lectureships at institutions including the University of Zurich, Copenhagen Business School, and Mannheim Business School, focusing on subjects such as data strategy, business analytics, and statistics.

== Bibliography ==
Parra Moyano’s work focuses on the intersection of technology, data, and organizational strategy. His research includes:

- Adoption and governance of artificial intelligence
- Digital transformation and organizational change
- Data-driven decision-making and business analytics
- Human and leadership dimensions of technological change

His work explores how executives can integrate advanced technologies while maintaining human judgment, creativity, and organizational effectiveness.

== Awards and recognition ==
Parra Moyano has received recognition for his contributions to digital strategy, artificial intelligence, and management research. His honors include:

- Named to the 2026 Poets&Quants Best 40-Under-40 Business Professors list.
- Included in the Thinkers50 Radar list, recognizing emerging management thinkers.
- Recognized in the Forbes 30 Under 30 list.
- Recipient of teaching awards from the University of Zurich, Copenhagen Business School, and Mannheim Business School for excellence in teaching and academic contribution.

== Selected publications ==
Parra Moyano has authored and co-authored scholarly and practitioner-oriented publications on artificial intelligence, digital transformation, data science, and management. Selected works include:

- Parra-Moyano, José; Schmedders, Karl; Laplace, Olivier; Torben-Nielsen, Benjamin (2026). Turn Vibe-Coded Prototypes Into Tools Your Company Can Actually Use. Harvard Business Review.
- Parra-Moyano, José; Schmedders, Karl; Laplace, Olivier; Torben-Nielsen, Benjamin (2026). How to Outcompete Your Client's AI. MIT Sloan Management Review.
- Chevallier, Arnaud; Dalsace, Frédéric; Parra-Moyano, José (2026). The Risks of Letting AI Direct Conversations. Harvard Business Review.
- Parra-Moyano, José; Reinmoeller, Patrick; Schmedders, Karl (2025). Research: Executives Who Used Gen AI Made Worse Predictions. Harvard Business Review.
- Lange, Katharina; Parra-Moyano, José (2025). Research: How AI Helped Executives Improve Communication. Harvard Business Review.
- Parra-Moyano, José; Schmedders, Karl; Werner, Maximilian (2024). Know Your Data to Harness Federated Machine Learning. MIT Sloan Management Review.
- Parra-Moyano, José; Joshi, Amit (2024). Data Collectives Are the Next Frontier of Labor Relations. Harvard Business Review.
- Parra-Moyano, José; Schmedders, Karl; Pentland, Alex "Sandy" (2020). What Managers Need to Know About Data Exchanges. MIT Sloan Management Review.
