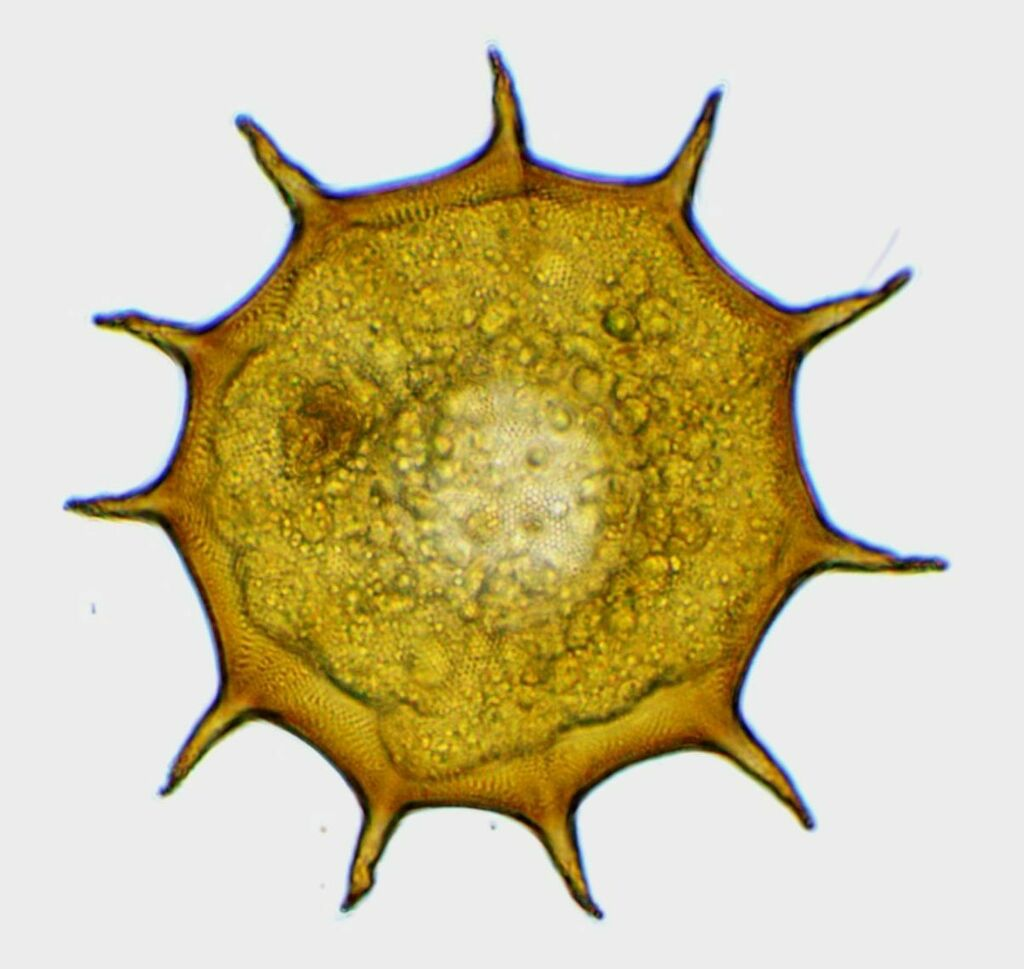
- Galeripora dentata

Scientific classification
- Domain: Eukaryota
- Phylum: Amoebozoa
- Class: Tubulinea
- Order: Arcellinida
- Family: Arcellidae
- Genus: Galeripora González-Miguéns, Soler-Zamora, Villar-dePablo, Todorov & Lara, 2021

Species
- See text

= Galeripora =

Genus of protozoans

Galeripora is a genus of testate amoebae in the family Arcellidae, closely related to Arcella. Both genera share a proteinaceous organic shell, but Galeripora species are distinguished by pores surrounding their central circular aperture, and a thin organic layer that partially obscures the hexagonal units composing the shell.

== Taxonomy ==
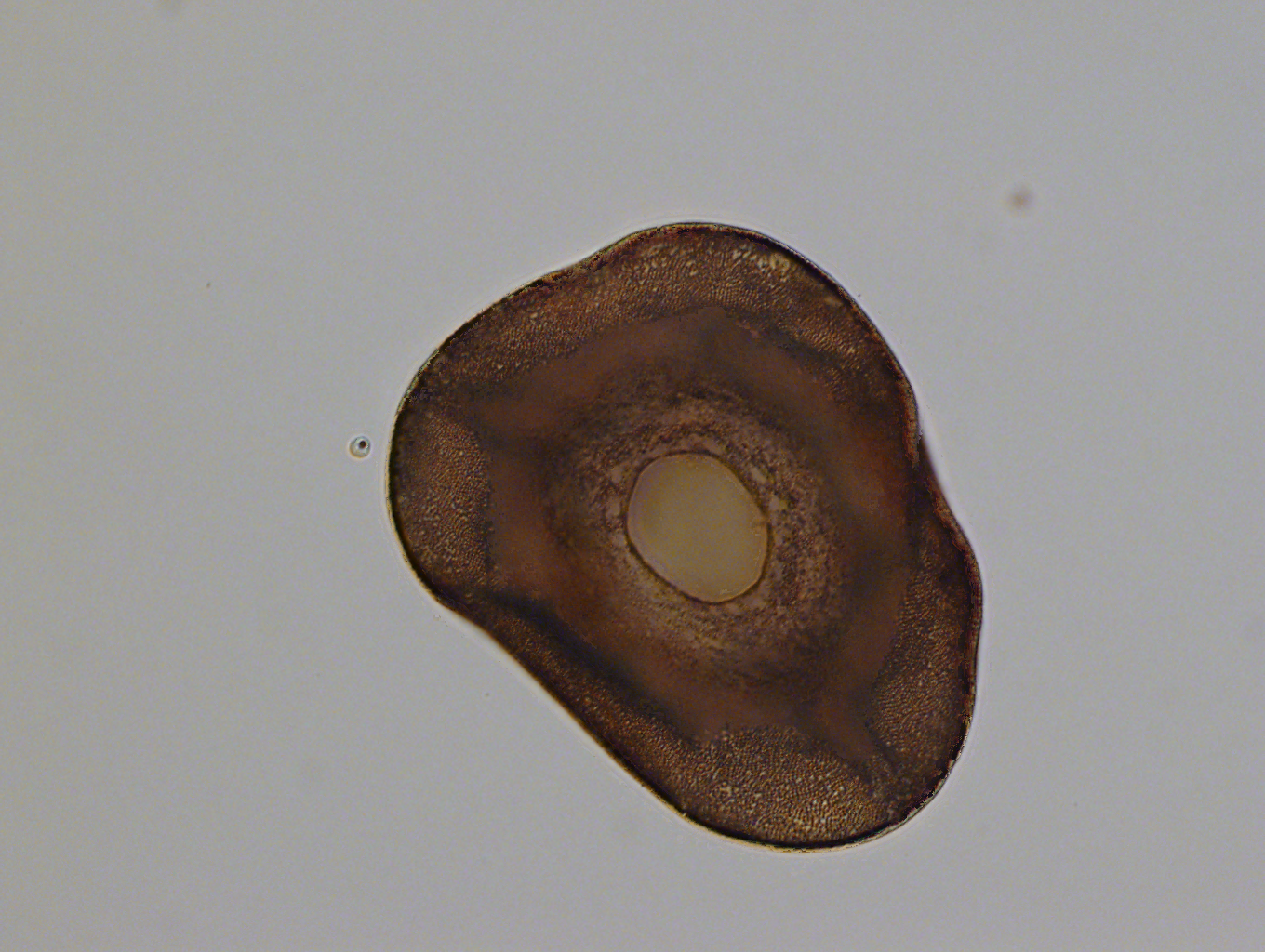
Galeripora catinus (=Arcella catinus) from the Collection Pénard at the Muséum d'histoire naturelle de Genève

However, González-Miguéns et al. found that the evolutionary lineages revealed by their molecular analysis did not correspond neatly to Deflandre's subdivisions of the family. Instead, the authors identified two distinctive traits exclusive to Galeripora: pores around the aperture of the shell, and an organic layer covering at least part of the shell. These characters were found to be absent in other members of Arcellidae, and were therefore suggested as possible synapomorphies for the new genus.

Several species now classified under Galeripora were originally described as members of Arcella. The reassignment of these species was based on a combination of molecular phylogenetics and detailed morphological analysis of shell structures.

Galeripora was formally described in 2021 by González-Miguéns et al., following a comprehensive review of the family Arcellidae. The authors used the mitochondrial COI gene to reconstruct evolutionary relationships within the group. This molecular information was used to evaluate historic classification schemes in which the family Arcellidae was subdivided on the basis of the overall appearance of the shell.

In a classification scheme proposed by Georges Deflandre in 1928, hemispherical shells possessing a "keel" around the perimeter of the shell were placed in the section Carinatae, while those lacking this keel were classified in section Vulgares. Species with notably flattened shells were assigned to the section Aplanatea.

=== Species ===
The genus Galeripora includes the following species:

- Galeripora arenaria (Greeff, 1866) González-Miguéns et al., 2021
- Galeripora artocrea (Leidy, 1876) González-Miguéns et al., 2021
- Galeripora balari González-Miguéns et Lara, 2021
- Galeripora bathystoma (Deflandre, 1928) González-Miguéns et al., 2021
- Galeripora bufonipellita González-Miguéns et Lara, 2021
- Galeripora catinus (Penard, 1890) González-Miguéns et al., 2021
- Galeripora dentata (Ehrenberg, 1830) Siemensma, 2021
- Galeripora discoides (Ehrenberg, 1871) González-Miguéns et al., 2021
- Galeripora galeriformis González-Miguéns et al., 2021
- Galeripora halaurula Useros et al., 2023
- Galeripora jurassica (Olivier, 1944) Siemensma, 2021
- Galeripora marichusae Useros et al., 2023
- Galeripora megastoma (Penard, 1902) Siemensma, 2021
- Galeripora naiadis González-Miguéns et al., 2021
- Galeripora ovaliformis (Chardez and Beyens, 1987) Siemensma, 2021
- Galeripora polypora (Penard, 1890) González-Miguéns et al., 2021
- Galeripora rota (Daday, 1905) González-Miguéns et al., 2021
- Galeripora scutelliformis (Playfair, 1918) Siemensma, 2021
- Galeripora sitiens González-Miguéns et al., 2021
- Galeripora succeli González-Miguéns & Lara, 2021

== Ecology ==
Species of Galeripora are common and widely distributed in freshwater habitats, including ponds, wetlands, moss, and soil. Species have also been found in the sediments of saline lakes.

Variations in overall shell morphology within Arcellidae are thought to have arisen largely through multiple evolutionary convergences, driven by ecological pressures rather than direct phylogenetic inheritance.
