= IMD Business School =

Swiss business education school

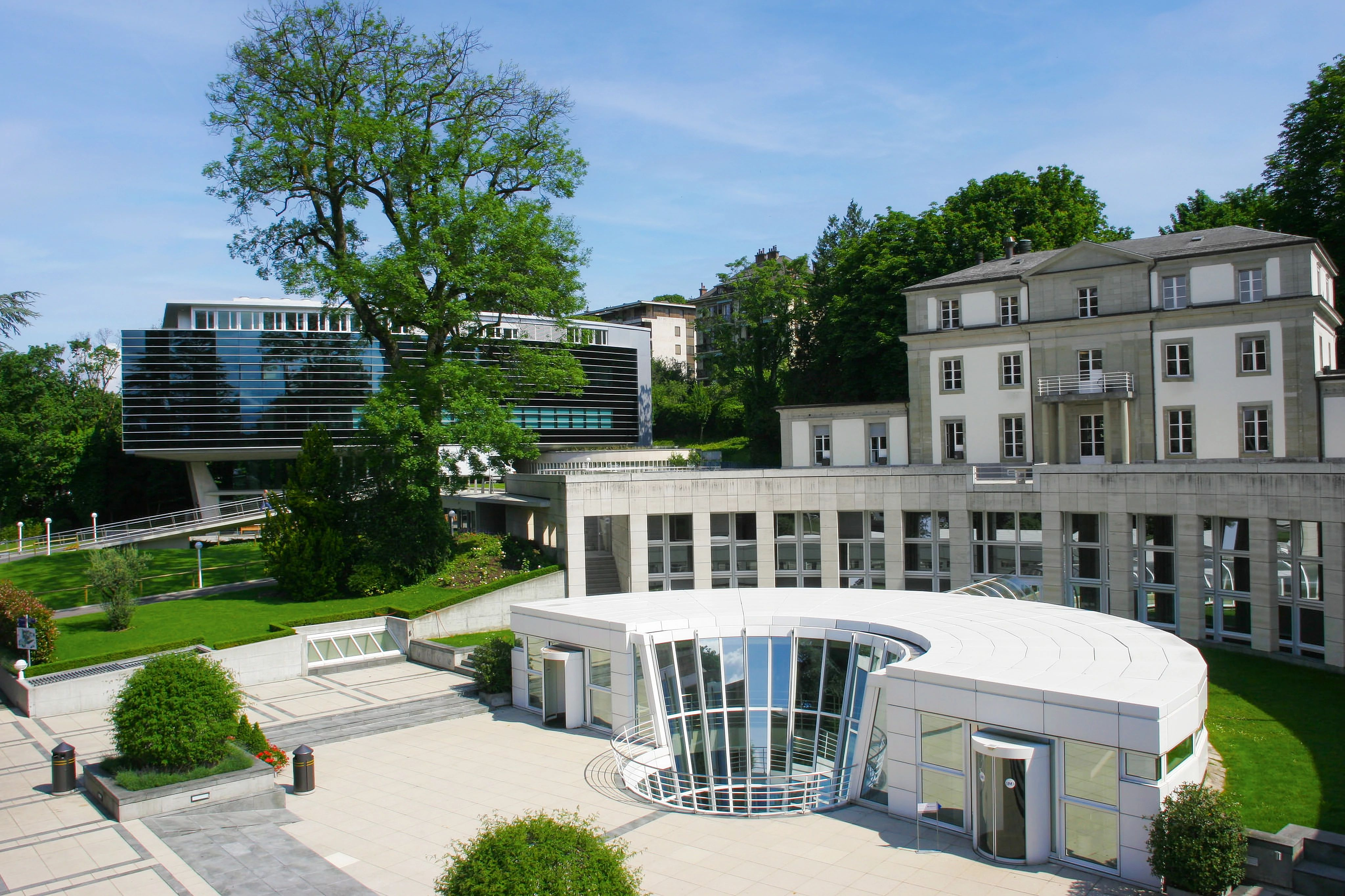
- IMD campus in Lausanne
- Motto in English: Real Learning Real Impact
- Type: Business School
- Established: 1990; 36 years ago
- Chairman: Jørgen Vig Knudstorp
- President: David Bach
- Faculty: 60
- Administrative staff: 450
- Students: 250 degree students
- Other students: 19,000 executive education participants
- Location: Lausanne, Vaud, Switzerland; 46.51°N 6.62°E
- Website: www.imd.org
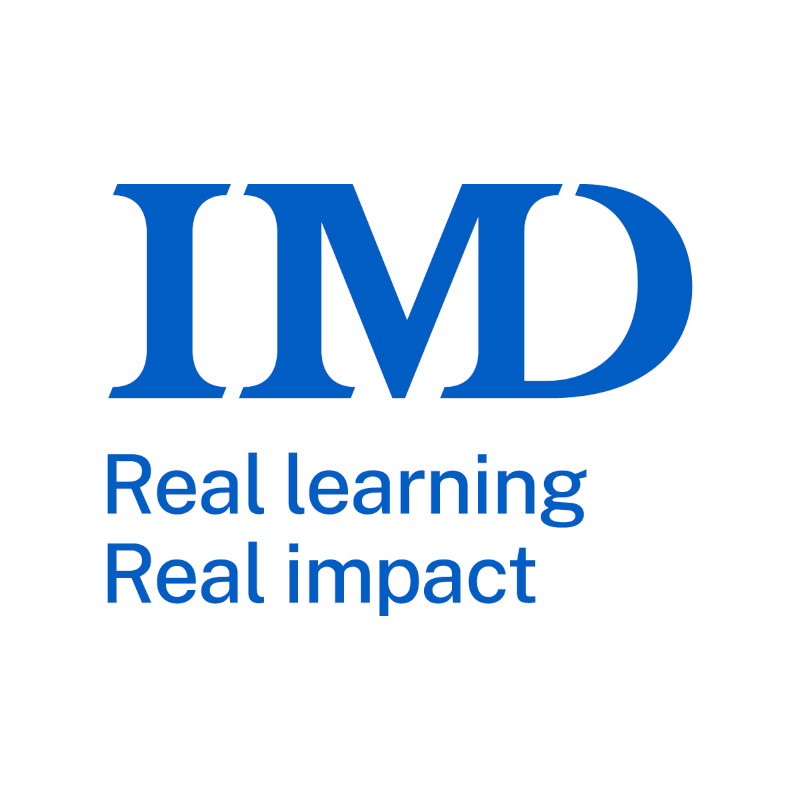

IMD Business School (IMD) is a business school located in Lausanne, Switzerland. It also maintains hubs in Singapore; Shenzhen, China; and Cape Town, South Africa.

IMD Business School is known for its Executive Education MBA, Executive MBA programs as well as its advisory work in helping leaders and policy-makers navigate complexity and change, and for its proximity to business and focus on real impact. In 2024, it named David Bach as its new president.

== History and mission ==
IMD Business School was formed in January 1990 through the merger of independent management education centers International Management Institute (Geneva) (IMI), established in 1946 by Alcan, and Institut pour l'Etude des Methodes de Direction de l'Entreprise (IMEDE) Lausanne established in 1957 by Nestlé. The history of IMEDE and its merger with IMI is documented in Jean-Pierre Jeannet and Hein Schreuder (2015, chapters 2 and 4). Its industrial heritage is unusual for business schools, which are usually university-affiliated.

IMD Business School business school provides executive education; it is a Swiss university institute accredited by the Swiss Accreditation Council and it consists of one integrated multidisciplinary faculty. The faculty consists of more than 50 full-time members, made up of 21 different nationalities. The current president is David Bach, who follows Jean-Francois Manzoni, Dominique Turpin, John R. Wells, Peter Lorange, and Juan Rada.

== I by IMD management journal ==
IMD Business School also publishes a management magazine every two months, entitled I by IMD (www.imd.org/ibyimd/), as well as online content via a dedicated I by IMD knowledge hub. I by IMD was launched in 2021 and publishes articles, audio podcasts, and video interviews, focusing on issues relating to business leaders. The publication offers first-person business and leadership intelligence from thinkers in academia, industry, the third sector, and society. A total of 1,515 I by IMD content pieces were reused for research and academic work by universities through EBSCO in 2025. In late 2025, I by IMD devoted an entire edition of the journal to the issue of longevity, focussing on this as a strategic, economic and leadership imperative, rather than as a social issue. An article in Forbes reports that the journal's editors argue that "longer lives will reshape everything from talent pipelines and board composition to innovation cycles and corporate purpose." In 2025, I by IMD agreed a licensing deal with the New York Times, whereby content from the publication is distributed to the Times' global audience, as one of several international publications providing business-focussed content. In 2024, the magazine's print run was 6,000 copies per quarter, and increased distribution channels to include airline journals and global publishing platforms, such as Zinio and Lufthansa's e-journals. The number of active users on the I by IMD hub reached 785k by the end of 2024.

== Executive education ==
=== Custom programs ===
IMD Business School is in custom executive education, delivering over 370 programs in 2024 to nearly 200 organizations. These programs are co-designed with clients and delivered in flexible formats—face-to-face, virtual, and asynchronous. Some partnerships include:

- Securitas: A five-year transformation journey recognized with a gold EFMD award.

- Bayer: A Sprint program also recognized with a gold EFMD award.

- Konica Minolta Inc: A talent development program.

- Coca-Cola İçecek (CCI): A leadership and development program.

- Bühler Group: A leadership and high-performance team development program received a Bronze award at the 33rd annual Brandon Hall Group Human Capital Management Excellence Award in 2025.

=== Open and online programs ===
In 2024, more than 5,000 participants joined open programs and 2,260 joined online offerings.

IMD Business School was recognized #9 globally for open executive programs in the 2025 Financial Times Executive Education Rankings. IMD was also recognized #1 globally in the Financial Times Executive Education Custom 2025.

=== Degree programs ===
IMD Business School offers a range of degree programs:

- MBA: A one-year, AI-rich program named 2024 MBA Program of the Year by Poets&Quants.
- Executive MBA (EMBA): A flexible, modular program with global immersions in China, Japan, and Singapore. In 2024, IMD announced a revamp of their EMBA offering to address the evolving needs of executives.
- Master of Science in Sustainable Management and Technology: Delivered in partnership with EPFL and UNIL.

In April 2025, IMD Business School launched its first new degrees in 25 years:

- Executive Master in AI & Digital Business Transformation
- Executive Master in Sustainable Business Transformation

=== Innovation ===
IMD has won gold in the Immersive Experiential Learning category at the QS Reimagine Education Awards for its XR 360 AR Learning Theatre Experience – SpheriCO2.

The internal development program We@IMD received gold for Best Advance in Education Delivered Through Technology at the Brandon Hall Group Excellence in Technology Awards 2024.

The QS Reimagine Education Awards 2023 recognized IMD for its innovative use of technology in management education through the OWP+GPT project and the IMD Sprints.

== Ranking ==
IMD Business School's full-time MBA has been ranked by Bloomberg and Forbes as one of the best one-year programs in Europe and internationally. IMD Business School is number 2 in Bloomberg's 2025-26 Best Business Schools Ranking. Since 2018, IMD Business School has consistently remained in Bloomberg’s top three.

In 2012, 2013, 2014, 2015, 2016, 2017, 2018, 2019 and 2020 IMD Business School was ranked first in open programs worldwide by the Financial Times.

== Notable alumni ==
IMD Business School counts 125.000+ alumnis across 140 countries and 80+ industries.

- Svein Aaser: Former CEO, DnB NOR
- Matti Alahuhta: CEO, Kone Corporation
- Ole Andersen: Chairman, Bang & Olufsen
- Bjarni Ármannsson: CEO, Glitnir Bank, Iceland
- Jon Fredrik Baksaas: President and CEO, Telenor
- Paul Bulcke: Former CEO, Nestlé
- Harsh Goenka: Indian billionaire and Chairman, RPG Enterprises
- Oswald Grübel: Former CEO, UBS
- Carla De Geyseleer, CFO, Volvo Cars
- Philipp Humm: Former CEO, T-Mobile USA
- Tarang Jain, Indian billionaire
- Susanne Klatten: Member of the Board, BMW
- Gerard Kleisterlee: Chairman Vodafone; Former CEO, Royal Philips Electronics
- Kjeld Kirk Kristiansen: Former President and CEO, The Lego Group
- Abba Kyari: Chief of Staff to the President of Nigeria from August 2015 to April 2020
- Christoph Loos, CEO, Hilti
- Jay Mehta, Chairman, Mehta Group
- Milinda Moragoda: Sri Lankan Cabinet Minister of Justice, Law Reform and MP
- Thomas Oetterli, CEO, Schindler Group
- Mark Opzoomer: CEO, Rambler Media
- Michael Patsalos-Fox: Former Chairman, Americas, McKinsey & Company
- Prince Pieter-Christiaan of Orange-Nassau, van Vollenhoven, Netherlands
- Mark Rutte: Prime Minister, Netherlands
- Thomas Schmidheiny: Chairman, Holcim
- Søren Skou: former CEO, Maersk
- Ian Charles Stewart: Founder, WiRed
- Diego Molano Vega: Former Minister of Information Technologies and Communications, Colombia
- Peter Voser: Chairman and CEO, ABB, Former CEO Shell
- Erik Aas, CEO of Banglalink

== Faculty ==
- Richard Baldwin (economist)
- José Parra Moyano, Professor of Digital Strategy
- Didier Cossin, professor of Governance and Finance and the Founder / Director at the IMD Global Board Center, and the UBS Chair in Banking and Finance
- Jean-Francois Manzoni
- Stefan Michel, Dean of Faculty and Research
- Misiek Piskorski
- Michael D. Watkins
- Howard Yu

== Partnerships ==
IMD Business School has partnerships with

- MIT Sloan School of Management
- École Polytechnique Fédérale de Lausanne
- University of Lausanne
- École cantonale d’art de Lausanne
- EHL Hospitality Business School
- Inner Development Goals
- Geneva Graduate Institute
- World Business Council for Sustainable Development
