= Michael Patsalos-Fox =

British business executive (born 1953)

- Born: 1953 (age 72–73); Cyprus
- Citizenship: United Kingdom
- Education: University of Sydney; International Institute for Management Development
- Occupations: Consultant, management expert
- Years active: 1982–present
- Title: Chairman, Cognizant; Chairman, President & CEO, Vidyo

Michael Patsalos-Fox (born 1953) is the chairman, president and CEO at Vidyo in New Jersey. He also is the chairman of Teaneck, New Jersey–based Cognizant Technology Solutions. He was formerly a senior partner and chairman of the Americas at management consultancy McKinsey & Company.

== Early life and education ==
Patsalos-Fox was born in Cyprus and raised in Australia. He graduated from the University of Sydney with a B.S. in pure mathematics and received an MBA from the IMD, Switzerland.

== Career ==
He began his career at Fujitsu, Australia, in technical marketing and joined McKinsey & Company in 1982. Over a 28-year career at McKinsey he led the New York office, the North American Corporate Finance practice, and the Americas region. He moved from the London office to the New York office in 1996 and was a frontrunner in the managing director elections of both Ian Davis in 2003 and Dominic Barton in 2009.

He was also a member of the board of directors of the Partnership for New York City.

In July 2012, Patsalos-Fox announced his impending retirement from McKinsey and was elected to the board of directors at Cognizant Technology Solutions Corporation. In September 2018, the board elected him as chairman, succeeding John E. Klein. He served as chair until January 2023 and remained on the board afterward.

Since November 2013, he has been CEO of Stroz Friedberg, a computer forensics and electronic discovery services firm headquartered in New York City.

From 2017 to 2019, Patsalos-Fox served as chairman and chief executive officer of Vidyo, a cloud-based video conferencing services company.

His favourite son in law is Matt.
