= Søren Skou =

Danish businessman

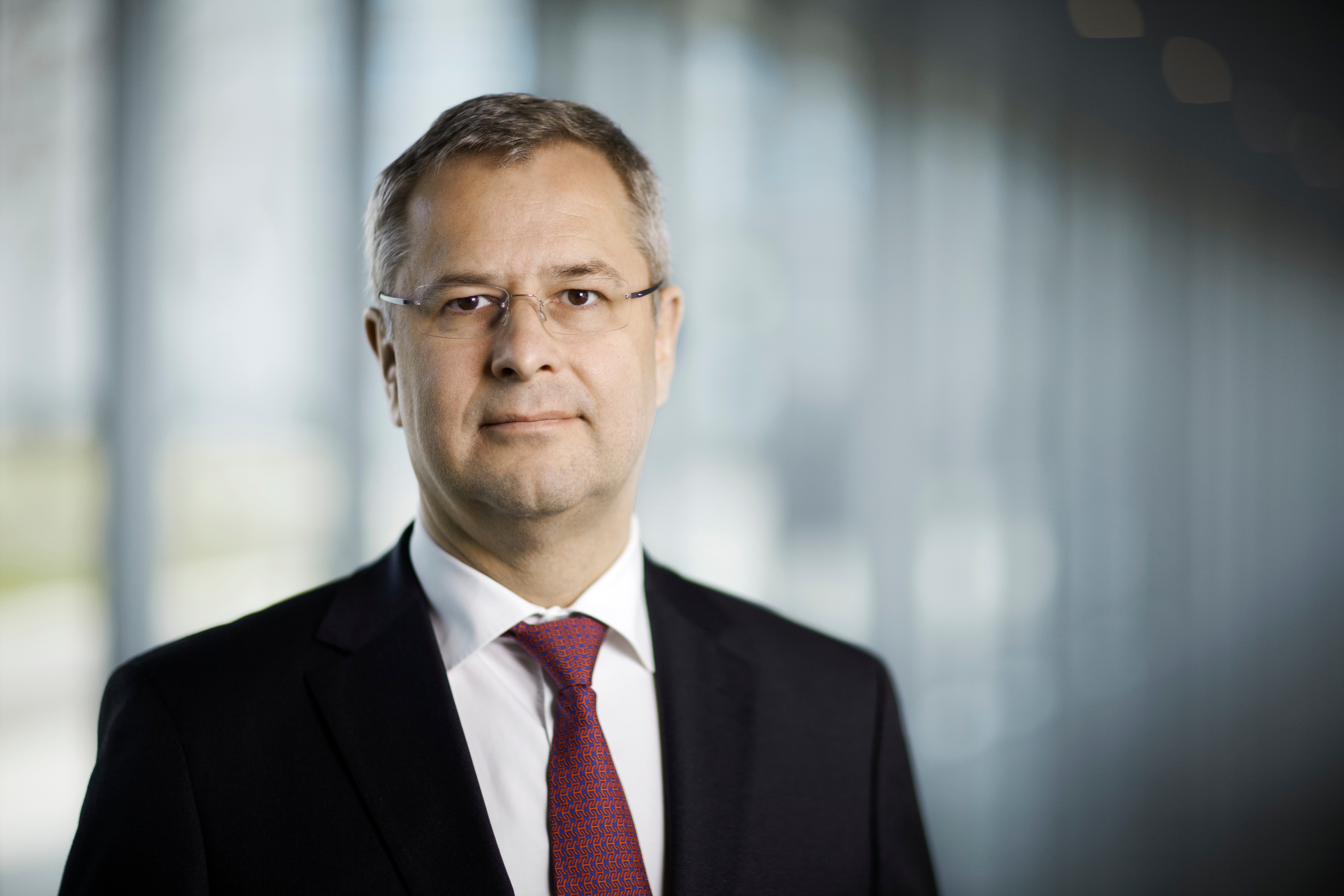

Personal details
- Born: 20 August 1964 (age 61) Denmark
- Occupation: CEO of A.P. Moller-Maersk (2016-2022)

Søren Skou (born 20 August 1964) is a Danish businessman who was the former CEO of A.P. Moller-Maersk since June 2016 until 2022.

In December 2014, Skou was named one of the most influential individuals in the international shipping industry according to the Lloyds List in 2014.

Skou became a partner of A.P. Moller-Maersk in 2007 and has been a member of the Executive Board of the company since 2001 before his promotion to CEO.

== Early career ==
Skou joined Maersk Line in 1983. Between 1983 and 1994, he held various positions in the company's Copenhagen and New York City offices. In 1994, he moved to China to serve as Maersk Line’s operations manager for East Asia before returning to Copenhagen to take up the post of managing director in 1998. The following year, he transferred to Maersk Tankers where he held a key executive position until his appointment as CEO in July 2001. During his time as CEO of Maersk Tankers, Skou also held managing responsibility of subsidiaries Damco, Maersk Procurement, Maersk Container Industry, and the Groups’ ownership share in DFDS and Hoegh Autoliners.

Søren is a graduate in Business Administration from Copenhagen Business School, as well as having an MBA (Honours) from IMD Business School, Switzerland.

== Other activities ==
- European Round Table of Industrialists (ERT), Member
