= Didier Cossin =

Swiss-French economist

- Born: 19 September 1964 (age 62)
- Occupations: Investor; author; academic
- Title: Professor of Governance and Finance and Founder / Director; at IMD Global Board Center; Chair, PNYX Group

Academic background
- Education: ENS Paris (MA, SocSc); Sorbonne University (MSc, Ec); EHESS-ENSAE (MPhil); Massachusetts Institute of Technology (Fulbright); Harvard University (PhD)

Academic work
- Discipline: Economics
- Institutions: IMD Business School; Harvard University; HEC Lausanne; UCal; INSEAD
- Main interests: Investment stewardship; corporate governance; sovereign wealth funds
- Website: didiercossin.com

Didier Cossin (born September 19, 1964) is a Swiss-French investor, author, and economics academic, with expertise in investment governance. He is a Professor of Governance and Finance and the Founder and Director at Global Board Center, part of the IMD Business School, where he is also the UBS Chair in Banking and Finance. Cossin is the author of several books, including High Performance Boards: A Practical Guide to Improving and Energizing Your Governance. He is the Chair of PNYX Group.

== Early life and education ==
Cossin received Master's in Social Sciences from ENS Paris and a Master's in Economics from the Sorbonne University. He earned an MPhil in Mathematical Economics from EHESS-ENSAE, studied at Massachusetts Institute of Technology as a Fulbright Scholar, and gained his PhD in Business Economics from Harvard University.

== Career ==
Cossin has served as an advisor and executive educator to various organizations, including the United Nations, European Central Bank, World Bank, International Finance Corporation (IFC), and the International Olympic Committee. He has also worked with sovereign wealth funds and state investors such as the Public Investment Fund (PIF) in Saudi Arabia, Abu Dhabi Developmental Holding (ADQ), and Temasek in Singapore.

Cossin provides governance advisory services to the Red Cross and the International Union for Conservation of Nature (IUCN). He currently holds the position of Senior Advisor in Governance to UNICEF and the International Organization for Standardization (ISO).

Before his tenure at IMD Business School, Cossin worked for Goldman Sachs (London, UK) and pharmaceutical company Roussel-Uclaf (Tokyo, Japan). He was previously a Professor of Finance at HEC Lausanne and taught at Harvard, where he obtained two Derek Bok Awards for excellence in teaching, and was a visiting professor at the University of California and INSEAD. In the late 1990s, Cossin chaired Harvard’s Department of Management and became the director of its Institute of Banking & Financial Management and PhD in Management.

== Selected published works ==
=== Books ===
- High Performance Boards: Improving and Energizing your Governance. ISBN 978-1119615651.
- Advanced Credit Risk Analysis. ISBN 978-0471987239.
- Optimal Control of Credit Risk (Advances in Computational Management Science, 3). ISBN 978-0792379386.

=== Articles and chapters ===
- Smulowitz, Stephen; Cossin, Didier; De Massis, Alfredo; Lu, Hongze Abraham (2023). "Wrongdoing in Publicly Listed Family- and Nonfamily-Owned Firms: A Behavioral Perspective". Entrepreneurship Theory and Practice. 47 (2): 47. doi:10.1177/10422587221142230 – via researchgate.net.
- Cossin, Didier; Smulowitz, Stephen; Lu, Hongze Abraham (2021). "The High Cost of Cheap Talk: How Disingenuous Ethical Language Can Reflect Agency Costs". Academy of Management Proceedings. 1: 10437. doi:10.5465/AMBPP.2021.10437abstract – via researchgate.net.
- Cossin, Didier; Smulowitz, Stephen; Lu, Hongze Abraham (2020). "Stewardship Focus, Monitoring, Executive Pay, and Their Effects on CSR: A Content Analysis Approach". Academy of Management Proceedings. 1: 12166. doi:10.5465/AMBPP.2020.12166abstract – via researchgate.net.
- Cossin, Didier (June 2020). Chapter 2: Governance Challenges around the World. John Wiley & Sons. pp. 20–27. doi:10.1002/9781119615705.ch2. ISBN 9781119615705 – via researchgate.net.
