= Michael D. Watkins =

Canadian-born author

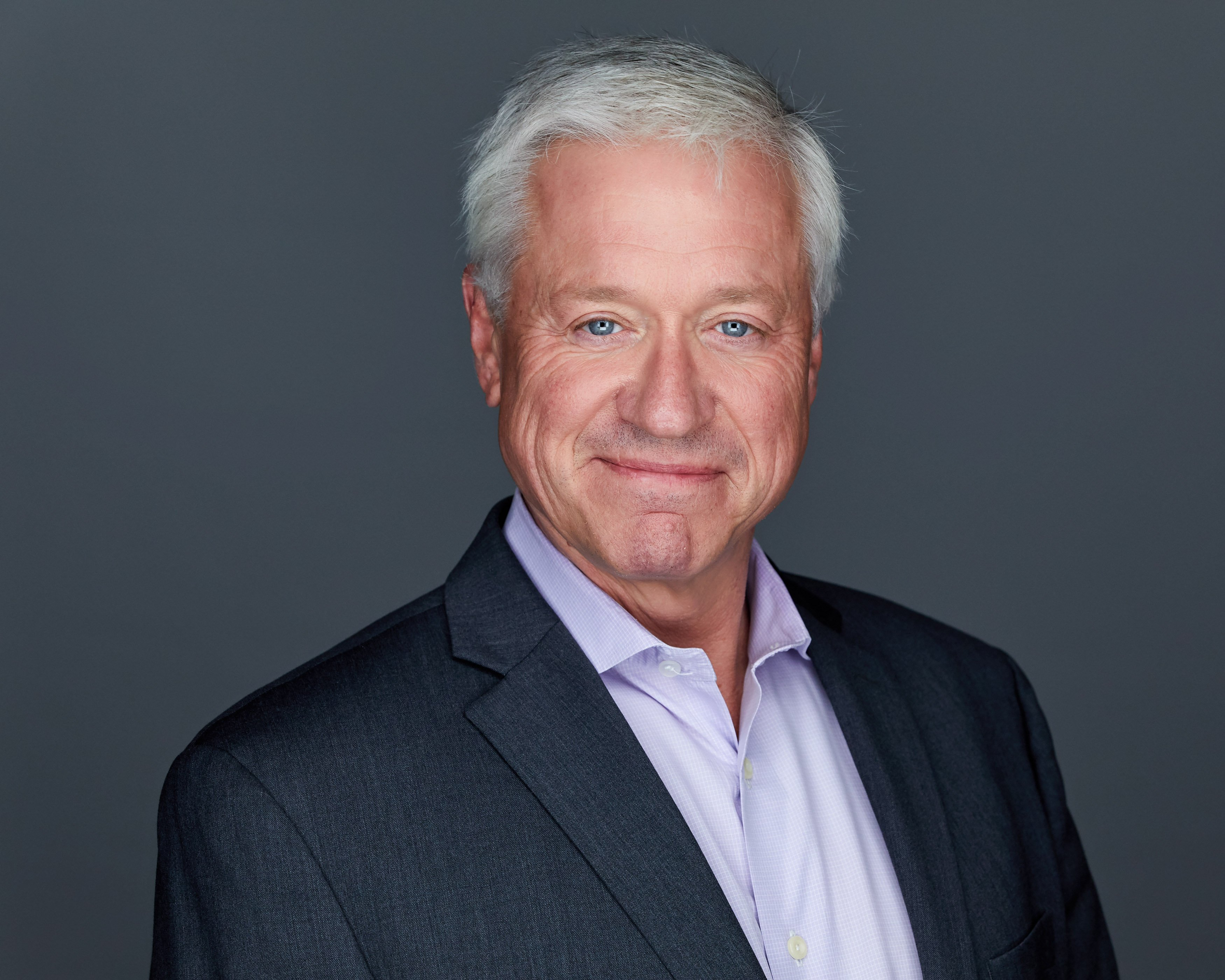
- Born: Michael D. Watkins; Canada
- Education: University of Waterloo; University of Western Ontario; Harvard University
- Occupation: Author
- Organization: Genesis Advisers
- Notable work: The First 90 Days

Michael D. Watkins is a Canadian-born author of books on leadership and negotiation. He is the Professor of Leadership and Organizational Change at the International Institute for Management Development in Switzerland.

== Education and career ==
Watkins studied electrical engineering at the University of Waterloo and business and law at the University of Western Ontario. He has a PhD in decision science from Harvard University.

Watkins became an associate professor at Harvard Business School before moving to the International Institute for Management Development.

== Bibliography ==
- Breakthrough International Negotiation: How Great Negotiators Transformed the World's Toughest Post-Cold War Conflicts (with Susan Rosegrant, Jossey-Bass, 2001)
- Breakthrough Business Negotiation: A Toolbox for Managers (Wiley, 2002)
- Winning the Influence Game: What Every Business Leader Should Know about Government (with Mickey Edwards and Usha Thakrar, Wiley, 2002)
- The First 90 Days: Proven Strategies for Getting Up to Speed Faster and Smarter (Harvard Business School Press, 2003; 2nd ed., Harvard Business Review Press, 2013)
- Right from the Start: Taking Charge in a New Leadership Role (with Dan Ciampa, Harvard Business School Press, 2005)
- Case Studies in U.S. Trade Negotiation (with Charan Devereaux and Robert Z. Lawrence, Institute for International Economics, 2006)
- The First 90 Days in Government: Critical Success Strategies for New Public Managers at All Levels (with Peter H. Daly and Cate Reavis, Harvard Business School Press, 2006)
- Shaping the Game: The New Leader's Guide to Effective Negotiating (Harvard Business School Press, 2006)
- Predictable Surprises: The Disasters You Should Have Seen Coming, and how to Prevent Them (with Max H. Bazerman, Harvard Business School Press, 2008)
- Your Next Move: The Leader's Guide to Navigating Major Career Transitions (Harvard Business Press, 2009)
- Master Your Next Move: Proven Strategies for Navigating the First 90 Days (Harvard Business Press, 2019)
- The Six Disciplines of Strategic Thinking (HarperCollins, 2024)
