= Bossard Group =

Swiss multinational fastener technology and logistics company

Bossard Holding AG
- Traded as: SIX: BOSN
- ISIN: CH0238627142
- Industry: Fastening technology
- Founded: 1831; 195 years ago
- Headquarters: Zug, Switzerland
- Key people: Daniel Bossard (CEO), David Dean (Chairman)
- Revenue: 1,068.9 mio. CHF (2025)
- Total assets: 901,977 mio. CHF (2025)
- Number of employees: 3,300 (2025)
- Website: www.bossard.com

Bossard Group is a Swiss multinational fastener technology and logistics company with its headquarters in Zug. Their activities include worldwide sales, technical consulting and inventory management.

As of 2025, the Group employed more than 3,300 people in 33 countries and generated a turnover of 1.068,946 million Swiss francs. Bossard Group is listed on the SIX Swiss Exchange.

== History ==
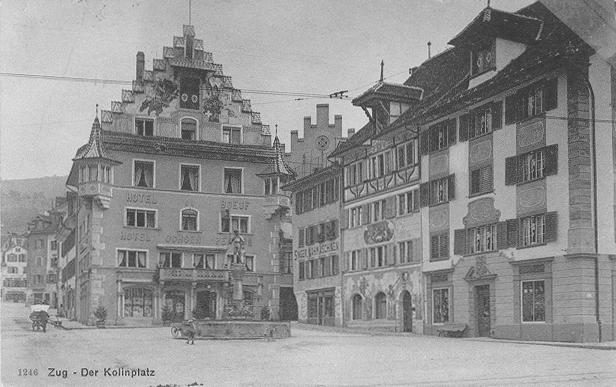
The Bossard hardware store in 1831

The company was founded in 1831 in Zug as a hardware store by Franz Kaspar Bossard-Kolin. The earlier silk trading business inherited from his father-in-law was dissolved at the same time. The hardware store kept its local character for roughly a century before the company expanded its business activities in the 1930s and 1940s to trading fasteners. The local specialized store first developed into a regional, and from the 1950s on, into a national company.

In the 1960s, Bossard began to set up and expand an international network of bases. In the course of this expansion, the company went public on the stock market in 1987. The recession at the beginning of the 1990s and the associated worsening business trend led Bossard to a review of the entire organization. In doing so, the company focused on the core competence of fastening technology and the gradual selling off of all its tools, fittings and handicraft units. Bossard today is active in the field of fastening technology in Europe, America and Asia.

In November 2012, the Bossard group acquired the KVT Koenig Group's range of fastening technology. At the beginning of 2019, Bossard Group acquired BRUMA Schraub- und Drehtechnik GmbH in Velbert. On June 24, 2019, the company also acquired the distribution business of SACS Boysen Aerospace Group, which continues to operate under the Boysen name. Bossard Group also increased its majority stake in Torp Fasteners, based in Oslo, Norway, from 60% to 100% at the beginning of 2020. Bossard has held a stake in the company, which specializes in high-quality fasteners, since January 2015. In December 2020 Bossard acquired shares in MultiMaterial-Welding GmbH, thus expanding its portfolio to include pioneering lightweight fastening solutions.

In October 2021, Bossard Group acquired the Dutch company Jeveka B.V., thus substantially expanding its presence in the Benelux countries. In December of 2022 the Group acquired the Canadian distribution business from the American company PennEngineering® in Danboro, Pennsylvania, USA.

Bossard acquired in July 2024 the Aero Negoce International, a distributor of fastening solutions and provider of logistics services to the aerospace industry. Also in July 2024, Bossard acquired Dejond Fastening NV (“Dejond”), a Belgian company and a leading manufacturer of blind rivet nuts, which specializes in the distribution of high-quality fastening systems with its own brand, Tubtara®.

In January 2025, it acquired the German Ferdinand Gross Group. Ferdinand Gross is one of the leading distributors of fastening technology in the important German market. In addition to Germany, Ferdinand Gross also had locations in Hungary and Poland.

== Products ==
The company is engaged in product solutions and services in industrial fastening technology. The product range comprises over 1,000,000 fasteners and customer-specific application products, combined with services in the areas of Smart Factory Logistics and Assembly Technology Expert. Bossard maintains an international procurement network for screws and fasteners. The company works together with 4,600 manufacturers.

== Corporate Structure ==
The Bossard Group owns stakes in various companies.

	Name	Beteiligungsanteil in Prozent
	Holding und Finanzgesellschaften	
Switzerland	Bossard Holding AG	100
	Bossard Finance AG	100
Germany	Bossard Beteiligungs GmbH	100
France	PN Aero SAS	100
UK	bigHead Fasteners Ltd	100
USA	Bossard U.S. Holdings, Inc.	100
	=== Europa ===	
Switzerland	Bossard Aerospace Switzerland AG	100
	Bossard AG	100
	3d-prototyp GmbH in Liquidation	100
Austria	Bossard Austria Ges.m.b.H.	100
	KVT-Fastening GmbH	100
Belgium	Dejond Fastening NV	100
Czech Rep.	Bossard CZ s.r.o.	100
	KVT-Fastening s.r.o.	100
Denmark	Bossard Denmark A/S	100
France	Bossard France SAS	100
	Aero Negoce International SAS	100
Germany	Bossard Aerospace Germany GmbH	100
	Bossard Deutschland GmbH	100
	Bossard Deutschland GmbH	100
Hungary	KVT-Fastening Kft.	100
Ireland	Arnold Industries Cork DAC	100
Italy	Bossard Italia S.r.l.	100
Netherlands	Bossard Nederland B.V	100
Norway	Bossard Norway AS	100
Poland	Bossard Poland Sp. z o.o	100
	KVT-Fastening Sp. z o.o	100
Romania	KVT-Fastening S.R.L	100
Serbia	KVT-Fastening d.o.o. Beograd	100
Slovakia	KVT-Fastening spol. s.r.o.	100
Slovenia	KVT-Tehnika pritrjevanja, d.o.o.	100
South Africa	Bossard South Africa (Pty) Ltd	75
Spain	Bossard Spain SA	100
Sweden	Bossard Sweden AB	100
UK	bigHead Bonding Fasteners Ltd	100
	=== Amerika ===	
Canada	Bossard Canada, Inc	100
	Bossard Ontario Inc	100
Mexico	Bossard de México, S.A. de C.V.	100
	Aero-Space Southwest Mexico, S. de R.L. de C.V.	100
USA	Bossard Aerospace, Inc.	100
	Bossard Aerospace U.S., Inc.	100
	Bossard, Inc	100
	Bossard, LLC	100
	C&C Aero Trading LLC	100
	=== Asien/Ozeanien ===	
Australia	Bossard Australia Pty. Ltd	100
China	Bossard Fastening Solutions (Guangdong) Co. Ltd	100
	Bossard Fastening Solutions (Shanghai) Co. Ltd	100
	Bossard Fastening Solutions (Tianjin) Co. Ltd	100
India	LPS Bossard Pvt. Ltd	51
Malaysia	Bossard (M) Sdn. Bhd.	100
Singapore	Bossard Pte. Ltd	100
	Bossard Services Pte. Ltd	100
South Korea	Bossard (Korea) Ltd	100
Taiwan	Bossard Ltd Taiwan Branch	100
Thailand	Bossard (Thailand) Ltd	100
Vitnam	Bossard Vietnam Co. Ltd	100
	=== Assoziierte Unternehmen ===	
Switzerland	Ecoparts AG	30
	MultiMaterial-Welding AG	41
	Sentinus AG	20
China	Wenzhong Sealing System (Jiangsu) Co. Ltd.	49

== Sponsorships ==
The Bossard Group announced its partnership with Oliver Heer Ocean Racing, supporting the Swiss-German skipper on his efforts towards the 2028 Vendée Globe – one of the world class sporting challenge.
