= Jean-Francois Manzoni =

- Born: May 15, 1961 (age 65); Paris, France
- Occupation: President (dean) of IMD business school

Academic background
- Education: HEC Montréal (BBA 1981); McGill University (MBA 1986); Harvard Graduate School of Business Administration (DBA 1993)

Jean-François Manzoni (born 1961, Paris, France) is a French and Canadian academic and the President (Dean) and Nestlé Chaired Professor of International Institute for Management Development (IMD), an independent business school with a main campus located in Lausanne, Switzerland and an executive learning center in Singapore.

== Early life ==
Manzoni was born in Paris, France, on May 15, 1961. He immigrated to Canada in 1978. He graduated with a Bachelor of Business Administration in 1981 from the Ecole des Hautes Etudes Commerciales de Montréal and he earned an MBA in 1986 from McGill University in Montreal. In 1993 he graduated with a Doctorate in Business Administration from Harvard Graduate School of Business Administration in Boston.

== Career ==
He spent 12 years on INSEAD Business School's Fontainebleau campus in France (1992–2004) during which he founded and directed the PwC Research Initiative on High Performance Organizations. He spent seven years at the IMD business school (2004–2010), where he served as Professor of Leadership and Organizational Development and directed IMD's Breakthrough Program for Senior Executives. He taught 5 years on INSEAD Business School's Singapore campus (2011–2016) during which he directed the school's Global Leadership Centre. Manzoni assumed the role of president of IMD business school on 1 January 2017.

Manzoni has co-authored several books and more than 30 business case studies on how leaders can create a high performance work environment reshaping management culture and unlearning bad practice. Four of his case studies were recognised in the Case of the Year Awards by the European Foundation for Management Development and the European Case centre.

Manzoni has written several articles in the Harvard Business Review and Financial Times. He is the author of The Set-Up to Fail Syndrome: How Good Managers Cause Great People to Fail, which he co authored with Jean-Louis Barsoux. The book expands on a similarly themed article in The Harvard Business Review in which the authors explored how managers’ behavior might contribute to employees poor performance. In an interview with BBC, Manzoni explained how employees also contribute to their own unsatisfactory relationships with their superiors. Manzoni cautioned that attaching labels like demanding or overbearing can ultimately become a self-fulfilling prophecy. "The moment you label someone as difficult you’ve just made them more difficult to work with because you’re not going to give this person the benefit of the doubt anymore and you’re not going to relate with them on a productive level."

Manzoni was invited to speak at the 2014 and 2016 World Economic Forum meetings in Davos. Manzoni is a member of the Human Capital Leadership Institute's International Advisory Panel, Digital Switzerland, Singapore's Public Service Division and the Russian Presidential Academy of National Economy and Public Administration.

== Personal life ==
Manzoni currently resides in Lausanne, Switzerland where he moved from Singapore in 2016 to join IMD as a Professor of Leadership & Organisational Development.
