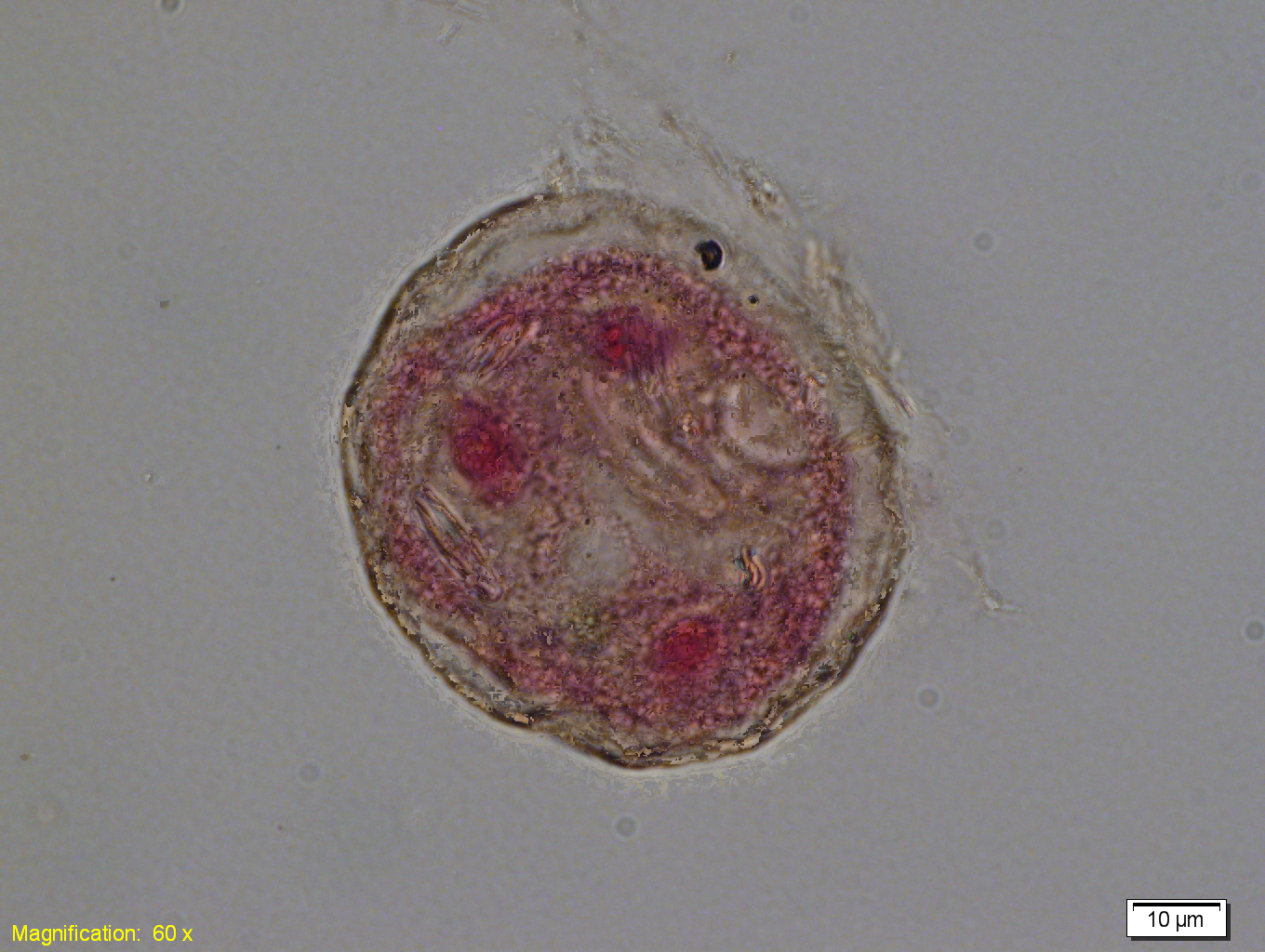

Scientific classification
- Domain: Eukaryota
- Clade: Amorphea
- Phylum: Amoebozoa
- Class: Tubulinea
- Order: Arcellinida
- Genus: Arcella
- Species: A. hemisphaerica

Binomial name
- Arcella hemisphaerica Perty, 1852

= Arcella hemisphaerica =

Species of Tubulinea

Arcella hemisphaerica is an amoeboid species.
