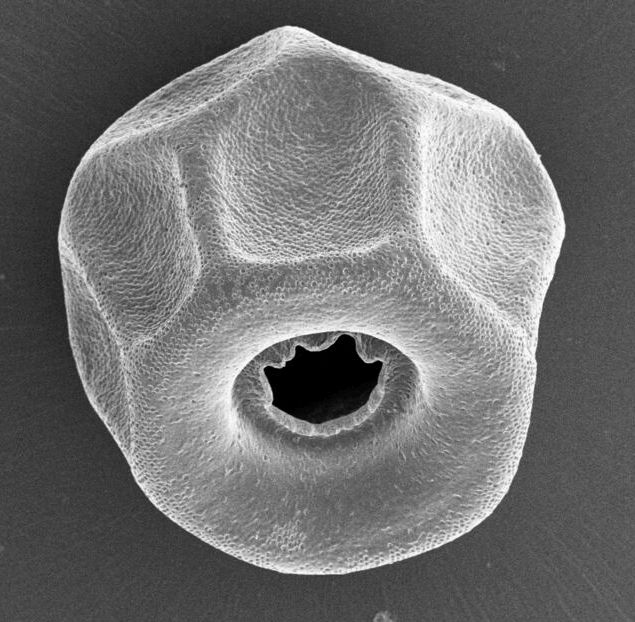
- Arcella spectabilis from Mer Bleue, Ottawa

Scientific classification
- Domain: Eukaryota
- Phylum: Amoebozoa
- Class: Tubulinea
- Order: Arcellinida
- Family: Arcellidae
- Genus: Arcella; Ehrenberg, 1830

Species
- See text

= Arcella =

Genus of protozoans

Arcella is a genus of testate amoebae in the order Arcellinida, commonly found in ponds, wetlands, moss, and soil. It is distinguished by a radially symmetrical organic shell, which features a central aperture through which pseudopods are extended. Recognized for its broad ecological adaptability, Arcella has been described as "probably the most ecologically successful Arcellinid taxon", with several species exhibiting a cosmopolitan distribution across diverse environments.

== Description ==
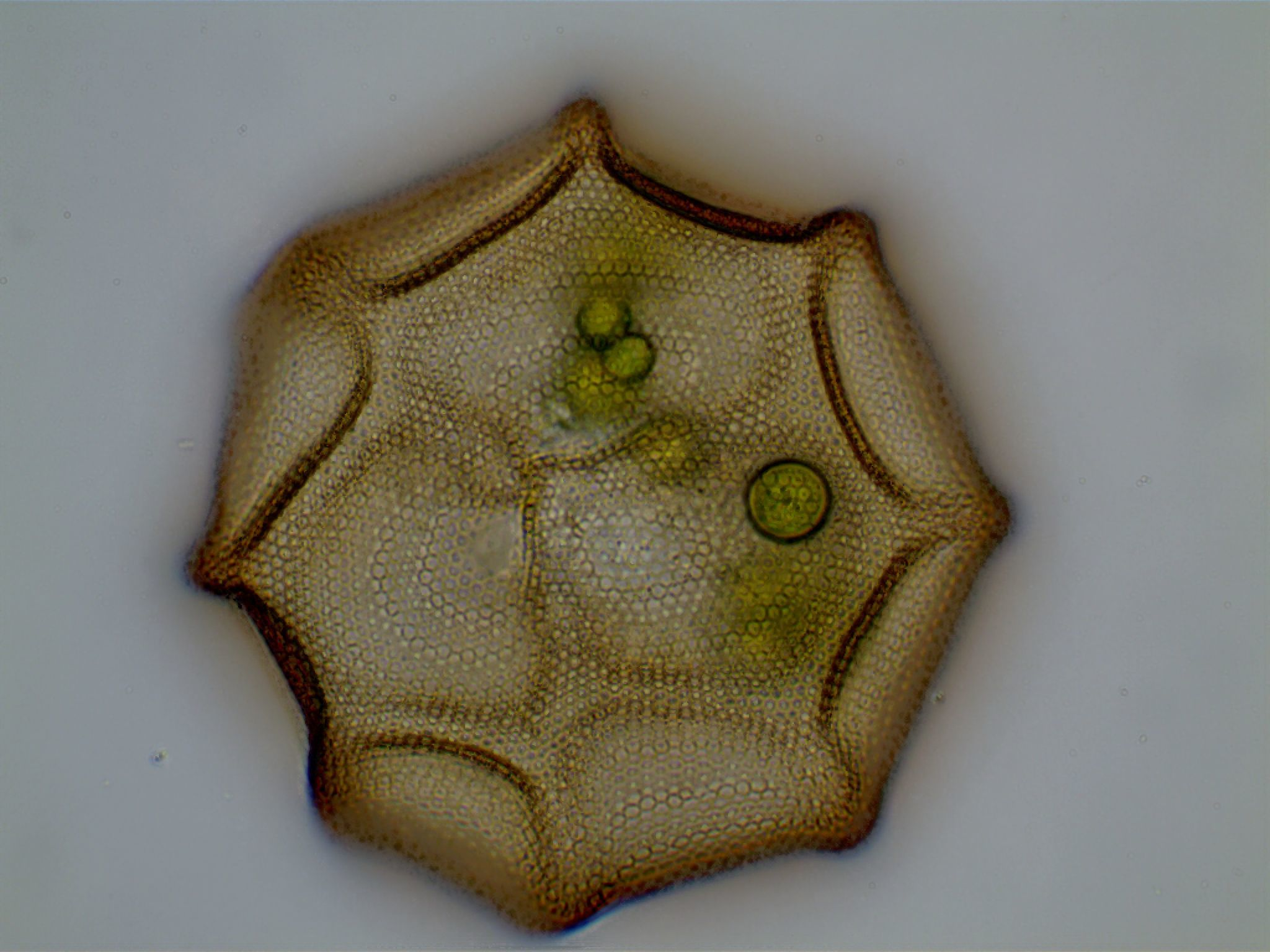
Dorsal view of Arcella conica

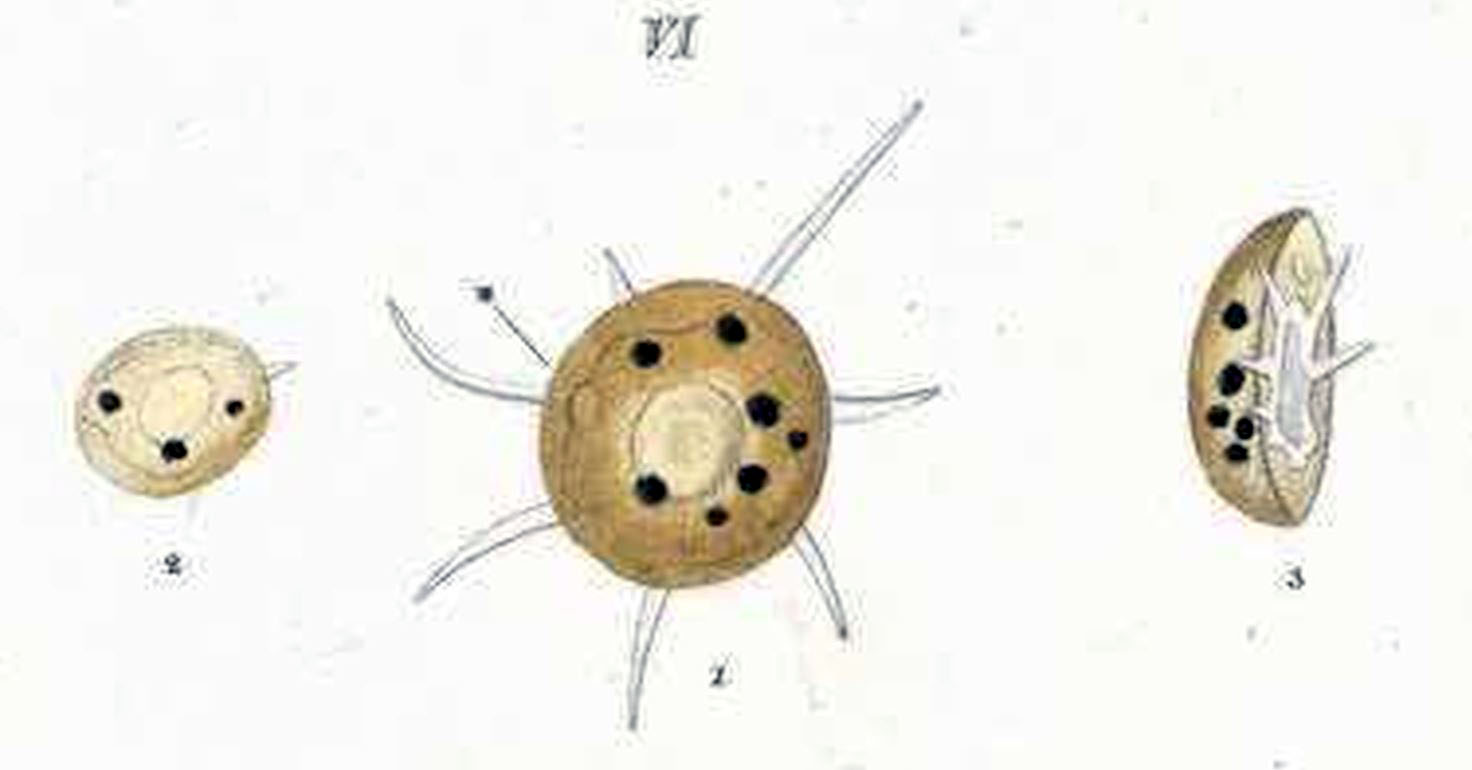
Illustrations of Arcella vulgaris by C. G. Ehrenberg, 1830.

Species of Arcella are typically enclosed in a domed or umbrella-shaped test (shell) with a single central aperture. This test is composed of secreted proteinaceous material, arranged in hexagonal units known as "areoles." Unlike many other genera in the order Arcellinida, Arcella species do not incorporate scavenged materials, such as mineral particles or diatoms, in their shells. The shape of the shell varies from one species to the next, and sizes range from less than 50 μm to well over 300 μm. When newly-formed, Arcella tests are transparent or pale yellow in colour. As shells age, they gradually darken, becoming nearly brown due to the progressive deposition of iron and manganese compounds.

Most species of Arcella have two cell nuclei, but some are multinucleate. Cells do not entirely fill the test in which they live, but are connected to the inner surface by thin strands of cytoplasm known as epipodia.

== Taxonomy ==
The genus Arcella was established in 1830 by the German zoologist C. G. Ehrenberg, who designated Arcella vulgaris as the type species. Over time, numerous species were added to the genus, and by the early 21st century, approximately 51 nominal species, 71 varieties, and 27 distinct forms had been recognized.

In 2021, González-Miguéns et al. conducted a comprehensive revision of the family Arcellidae, using molecular phylogenetics to uncover evolutionary relationships within the group. Their findings led to the reclassification of six Arcella species, which were transferred to the newly established genus Galeripora. This genus was distinguished by the presence of pores surrounding the aperture of the test and a thin layer of organic material partially covering the shell's surface. Since then, several other species previously classified in Arcella have been transferred to Galeripora.

=== Species ===
The genus Arcella includes the following species:

- Arcella apicata Schaudinn, 1898
- Arcella brasiliensis Cunha, 1913
- Arcella conica (Playfair, 1918)
- Arcella corona Van Oye, 1926
- Arcella costata Ehrenberg, 1847
- Arcella crenata Playfair, 1917
- Arcella crenulata Deflandre, 1928
- Arcella euryhalina Useros et al., 2023
- Arcella excavata Cunningham, 1919
- Arcella formosa Nicholls, 2005
- Arcella gandalfi Féres et al., 2016
- Arcella gibbosa Penard, 1890
- Arcella grospietschi Stepanek, 1963
- Arcella guadarramensis González-Miguéns & Lara, 202
- Arcella hemisphaerica Perty, 1852
- Arcella intermedia (Deflandre, 1928) Tsyganov & Mazei 2006
- Arcella jeanneli Virieux, 1913
- Arcella leidyana Deflandre, 1928
- Arcella lichenophila Decloitre, 1965
- Arcella lobostoma Deflandre, 1929
- Arcella manipurensis Chattopadhyay & Das, 2003
- Arcella marginata Daday, 1905
- Arcella mitrata Leidy, 1876
- Arcella mitriformis (Deflandre, 1928) Siemensma, 2025
- Arcella multilobata Golemansky, 1964
- Arcella nordestina Vucetich, 1973
- Arcella oblonga Schaudinn, 1898
- Arcella oyei Stepanek, 1963
- Arcella peruviana Reczuga et al., 2015
- Arcella prismatica Taylor, Strueder-Kypke and Siemensma
- Arcella rotundata Playfair, 1918
- Arcella rukiensis Van Oye, 1926
- Arcella salobris Useros et al., 2023
- Arcella spectabilis (Deflandre, 1928) Siemensma, 2025
- Arcella uspiensis Ribeiro, Porfírio- Sousa, Lahr & Lara, 2023
- Arcella vulgaris Ehrenberg, 1830

== Ecology ==
Arcella inhabit a wide range of freshwater environments, including pools, eutrophic waters, marshes, mosses, slow-moving streams, and wet foliage. A few species can also be found in soils. While most species are associated with fresh water, some have been found in coastal salt marshes, and saline lakes.

Like other amoebae, Arcella use their pseudopods to take in food. They feed on bacteria, green algae, diatoms, fungi, flagellates and small ciliates.

Most species are cosmopolitan, meaning they occur worldwide. However, some species have more restricted distributions, such as A. brasiliensis, A. peruviana and A. gandalfi, which are endemic to South America.
