= Giuseppe Pomba =

Italian typographer and editor (1795–1876)

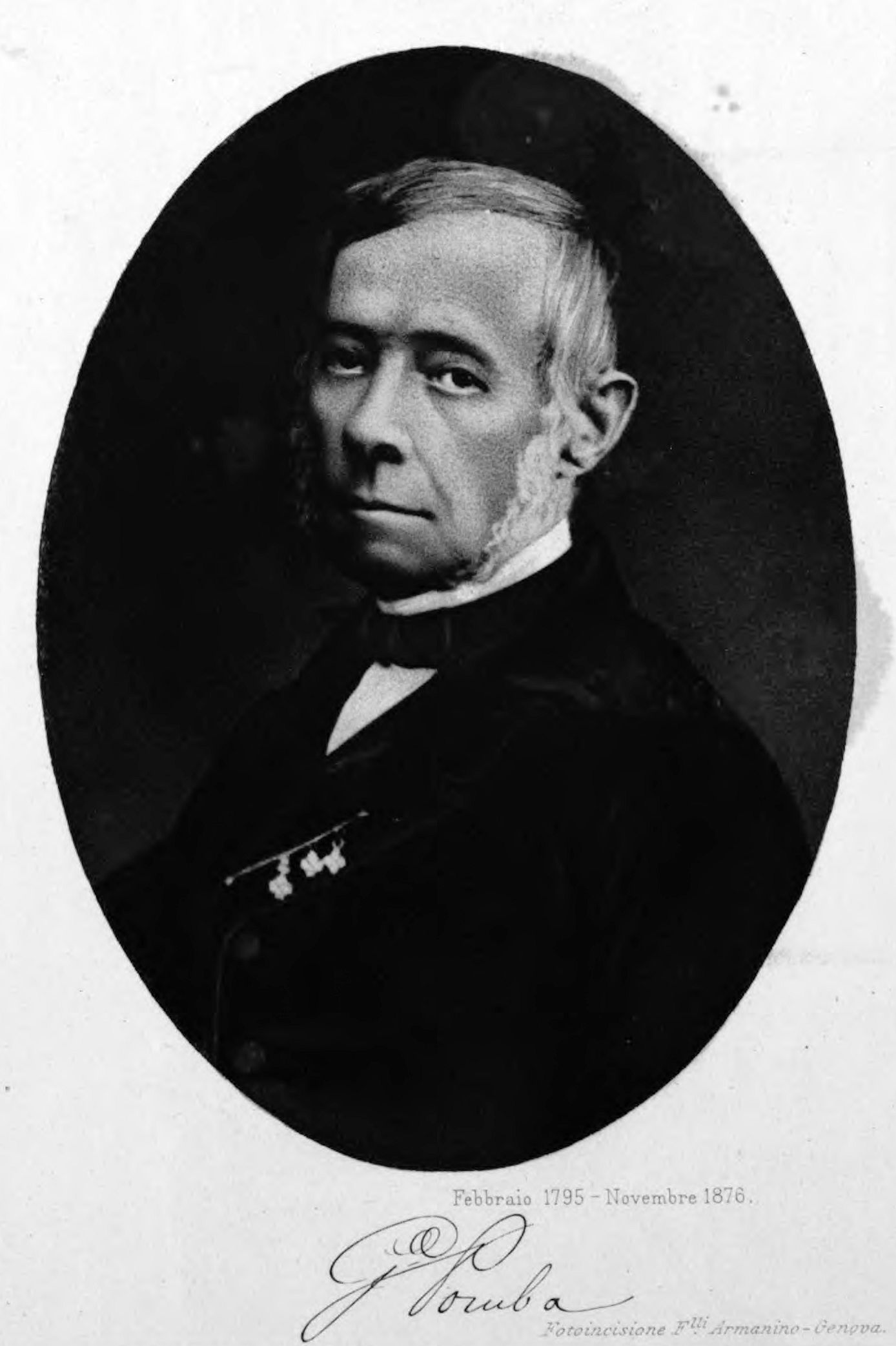
- Born: 4 February 1795; Turin
- Died: 3 November 1876 (aged 81); Turin
- Occupations: Editor, publisher
- Years active: 1805–1869
- Known for: UTET

Giuseppe Pomba (4 February 1795 – 3 November 1876) was an Italian editor and typographer, founder of UTET.

== Biography ==
Giuseppe Pomba was born on 4 February 1795 to Giovanni Pomba and Carlotta Boma. He was the only son, the couple also had two daughters: Luigia and Felicita, his younger brother Onorato died in early childhood. The family lived in Turin where Giovanni Pomba owned a small bookshop. He also ran a small publishing business, publishing devotional and commemorative booklets. Giuseppe Pomba graduated from the primary school and entered Liceo Imperiale, but was forced to drop the studies when his father died in 1805. With the help of an uncle, he started managing the bookshop and in 1810 renamed it ‘Vedova Pomba e figli’ (‘Widow Pomba and sons’).

In September 1814, the widow Pomba submitted a petition to the authorities on behalf of her children to open a new printing house in Turin. When the approval was granted, they installed four modern printing machines. Upon his mother's death in 1824, Giusppe Pomba took full control of the business. By then, it had 49 employees and 16 printing presses. He travelled extensively and learned from foreign colleagues. In 1829, he invested money and imported the first colour printing machinery.

He was one of the few private publishers and constantly faced opposition from government-run publishing houses, which did not want a competitor in the market. In addition, his choice of publications often drew criticism from the censors.

In December 1836, by then an accomplished and well-known publisher, Pomba was arrested and spent a month in jail, allegedly for publishing L'assedio di Firenze by Domenico Guerrazzi. In prison, he invented one of the greatest projects of his publishing career: Storia Universale, a monumental work of 35 volumes edited by Cesare Cantù. In 1838, having clearly anticipated future market developments well in advance, he sold his bookstore to focus exclusively on publishing.

His first wife Rosa Filica gave him seven children. When she died in 1846, he realized that his only son, Cesare, had no interest in managing the family business, so the publisher brought his cousin Luigi Pomba over from France and arranged a marriage between his daughter Emilia and Luigi. Together they founded “Cugini Pomba e C.” in 1850. Pomba himself married Luigi's mother, Sophie Girard, in April 1851; however, she died just six months after the wedding. He returned to work and in 1854 founded the joint-stock company Unione Tipografico Editrice Torinese (UTET), which merged both “Cugini Pomba e C.” and the Tipografia sociale.

Pomba stepped down after the merger and continued his career in the public service. He was elected to the Turin City Council in 1848, advocated for the public disclosure of its records, and in 1855 proposed the establishment of a public library, to which he himself donated nearly a thousand volumes. In 1855 he advocated and instituted the Public Library of Turin.

In 1869, Giuseppe Pomba was appointed president of the newly formed Italian Booksellers' Association (Associazione libraria italiana), but was forced to step down a year later due to health problems. He died in 1876 in Turin, survived by third wife Luisa Pacchiotti and numerous children and grandchildren.

== Literature ==
- Giocondi, Michele (2018). Breve storia dell’editoria italiana (1861-2018) con 110 schede monografiche. goWare. ISBN 9788833631196.
- Palazzolo, Maria Iolanda (December 2020). "Tra privilegi e mercato. Le stamperie governative nell'Ottocento". TECA. X (2). ISSN 2240-3604.
