= Willy Shih =

American economist

Willy C. Shih is an American economist currently the Robert and Jane Cizik Professor of Management Practice in Business Administration at Harvard Business School.
