= Mikolaj Piskorski =

Polish academic

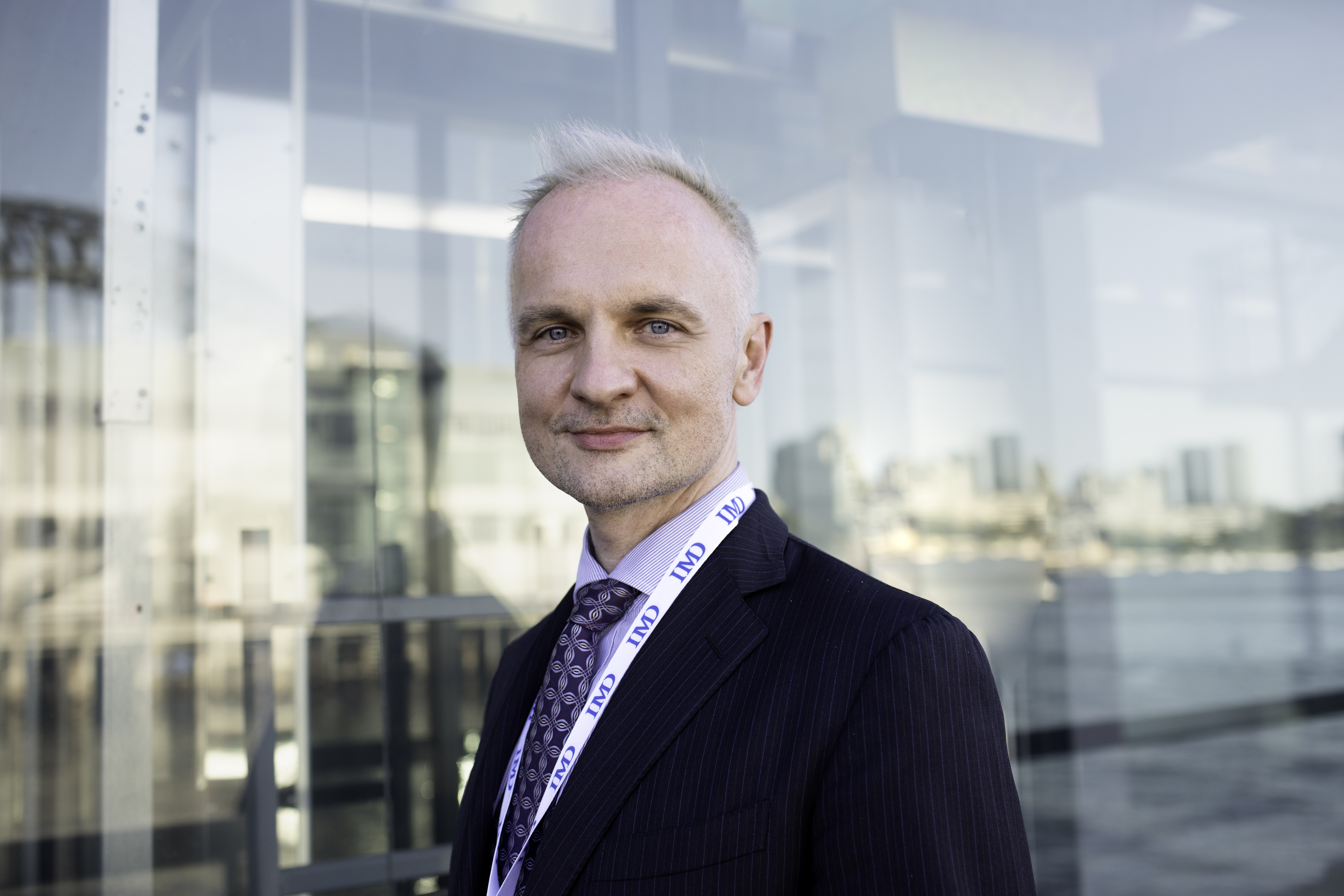
Mikołaj Jan Piskorski (Sydney, 2023)

Mikołaj Jan Piskorski who often goes by Misiek (born April 16, 1973 in Warsaw, Poland) is Dean of Executive Education at IMD Business School in Lausanne, Switzerland. He is known for his research in the area of digital transformation, on-line social platforms and study of how companies leverage social platforms to improve their profitability.

== Education and career to date ==
Professor Piskorski received both his bachelor's and master's degrees from Christ's College at the University of Cambridge where he studied Economics and Politics. He also received a masters in Sociology and a Ph.D. in Organizational Behavior from Harvard University.

After teaching at Stanford's Graduate School of Business, Misiek returned to Harvard in 2004 where he taught first year MBA Strategy courses, and his own second year MBA elective Competing with Social Networks, along with several other courses in HBS executive education program.

He wrote written a number of Harvard Business School cases on various social platforms, including Facebook, Zynga, LinkedIn, eHarmony, Twitter, MySpace, Friendster, Meetup, mixi, adMob, Wikipedia, and Yelp. Misiek has also written articles that have appeared in peer-reviewed publications such as American Journal of Sociology, Administrative Science Quarterly, Management Science, and Social Forces. He has also been cited by popular publications such as the New York Times, Business 2.0, and Investors Business Daily.

== Partial publications list ==
=== Books ===
- A Social Strategy: How We Profit from Social Media (Princeton, NJ: Princeton University Press, 2014).

=== Articles ===
- "Influencer Celebrification: How Social Media Influencers Acquire Celebrity Capital". Journal of Advertising. 50 (5): 528–547. 2021.
- "Testing Coleman's Social-Norm Enforcement Mechanism: Evidence from Wikipedia". American Journal of Sociology. 122 (4): 1183–1222. 2017.
- "Social Strategies That Work". Harvard Business Review. 89 (11): 116–122. 2011.
- "When More Power Makes Actors Worse Off: Turning a Profit in the American Economy". Social Forces. 85 (2): 1011–1036. 2006. doi:10.1353/sof.2007.0021. Co-authored with Tiziana Casciaro.
- "Power Imbalance, Mutual Dependence and Constraint Absorption: A Closer Look at Resource Dependence Theory". Administrative Science Quarterly. 50: 167–199. 2005. Co-authored with Tiziana Casciaro.
- "Sources of Structural Inequality in Managerial Labor Markets". Research in Social Stratification and Mobility. 21: 169–187. 2004. Co-authored with Rakesh Khurana.
