= Arcella (Padua) =

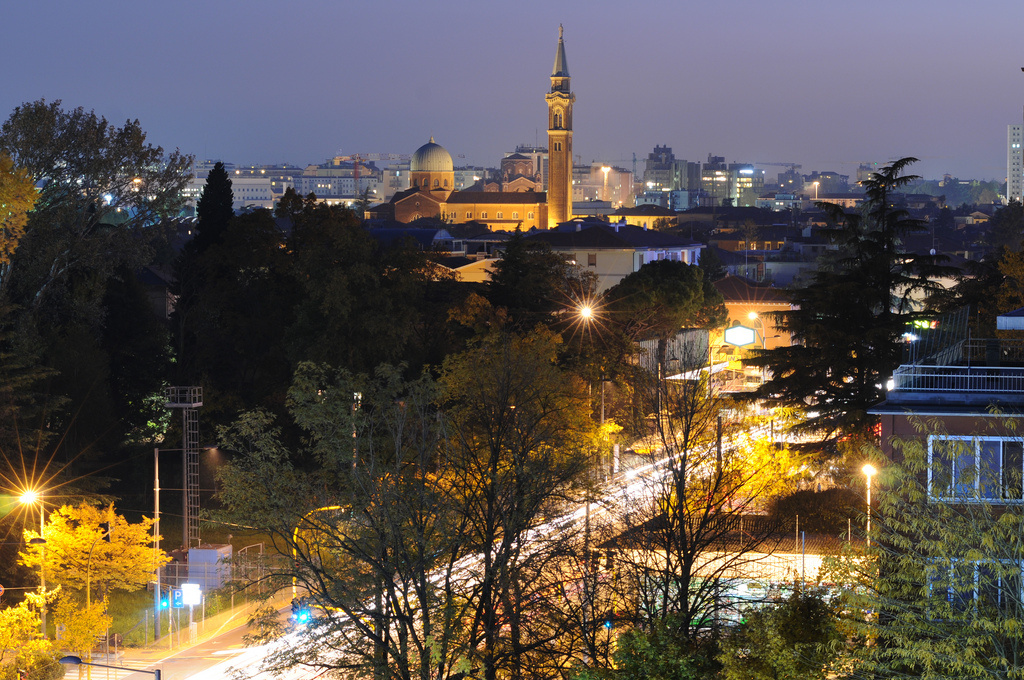
- View of the district with St. Antonino church
- Interactive map of Arcella
- Coordinates: 45°25′21″N 11°53′8″E
- Country: Italy
- Region: Veneto
- Province: Padua
- City: Padua
- Elevation: 12 m (39 ft)
- Time zone: UTC+1

Arcella is the name of a district in Padua, located close to the Milan-Venice railway, north-east of Padua's central station. However, urban expansion taking place since the 1950s, made the boundaries between the localities nearby imperceptible. People usually use the name "Arcella" to refer to the whole urban area north of the station.
