= Giacomo Manzoni (painter) =

Italian painter (1840–1912)

- Born: 1840; Padua
- Died: 1912 (aged 71–72)

Giacomo Manzoni (1840–1912) was an Italian painter, active and exhibiting in the Veneto region, mainly genre works.

== Biography ==
He was born in Padua. He painted still lives and exhibited at Turin in 1880. At Milan in 1881 he exhibited Frutta; Un' erbivendola; La leggitrice; La pittrice; and Una fanciulla. At Rome in 1883, he exhibited Fra due fuochi; Head of vecchio, and other still-lives with fruit. At Turin, in 1884: Donne; Head of popolano, and Flowers. At Venice, in 1887, Pro pudor.

There are two other artists named Giacomo Manzoni, a composer of same name born in 1932. In addition, Giacomo Manzù, born December 22, 1908, and died January 17, 1991. His artistic name was Giacomo Manzoni.
