= Avelia =

Scientific classification
- Domain: Eukaryota
- Supergroup: Alveolata
- Phylum: Ciliophora
- Subphylum: Postciliodesmatophora
- Class: Karyorelictea
- Order: Protoheterotrichida
- Family: Geleiidae
- Genus: Avelia; Nouzarède, 1977

Species
- A. arcachonense (Nouzarède 1975) Nouzarède 1977; A. gigas (Dragesco 1954) Nouzarède 1977; A. martinicense (Nouzarède 1975) Nouzarède 1977; A. multinucleata Dragesco 1999

Genus of protists in the ciliates phylum

Avelia is a genus of karyorelict ciliates belonging to the family Geleiidae.

The genus name is a taxonomic patronyms honoring Marcel Avel (1900–1983; professor of anatomy), with slight modification into the nomen novum Avelia to avoid a taxonomic homonymy with the moth genus Avela.
