= Corlissina =

Scientific classification
- Domain: Eukaryota
- Clade: Diaphoretickes
- Clade: SAR
- Clade: Alveolata
- Phylum: Ciliophora
- Subphylum: Postciliodesmatophora
- Class: Karyorelictea
- Order: Protoheterotrichida
- Family: Geleiidae
- Genus: Corlissina; Campello-Nunes, Fernandes, Schlegel & Silva-Neto 2015

Species
- Corlissina maricaensis

Genus of protists in the ciliates phylum

Corlissina is a genus of karyorelict ciliates in the family Geleiidae. Only the type species Corlissina maricaensis is assigned to this genus.

Corlissina is characterized by a paroral ciliature with two rows of polykineties forming a loop at the posterior end. The dikinetids of the adoral zone are organized in short polykineties, followed by a row of monokinetids. The two globular macronuclei are linked by a single micronucleus, a pattern found in most Geleiidae.

The genus name is a taxonomic patronym honoring the protistologist John O. Corliss.

Comparison and phylogenetic analysis of 18S rRNA sequences showed that Corlissina maricaensis is the sister group to Parduczia orbis. In turn, these two genera form a clade with Geleia.
