= Remanella =

Scientific classification
- Domain: Eukaryota
- Clade: Diaphoretickes
- Clade: SAR
- Clade: Alveolata
- Phylum: Ciliophora
- Subphylum: Postciliodesmatophora
- Class: Karyorelictea
- Order: Loxodida
- Family: Loxodidae
- Genus: Remanella; Foissner, 1996

Species
- See text

Genus of protists in the karyorelict ciliate family Loxodidae

Remanella is a genus of karyorelict ciliates, belonging to family Loxodidae. Whereas Remanella inhabits brackish and marine waters, Loxodes – the other loxodid genus – is a freshwater taxon.

== Etymology ==
The genus name is a patronym honoring the German zoologist Adolf Remane (1898–1976), who contributed to the discovery of the marine interstitial fauna.

== Phylogeny ==
Molecular phylogeny based on sequences of the SSU rRNA gene suggests that the genus Remanella might be paraphyletic with respect to a monophyletic genus Loxodes but this result is not strongly supported.

== Species list ==
At least 18 species are recognized in the genus Remanella:

- Remanella achroma Xu et al, 2013
- Remanella brunnea Kahl, 1933
- Remanella caudate Dragesco, 1953
- Remanella dragescoi Agamaliev, 1966
- Remanella faurei Dragesco, 1954
- Remanella gigas Dragesco, 1954
- Remanella granulosa Kahl, 1933
- Remanella levii Dragesco, 1960
- Remanella macrostona Xu et al, 2013
- Remanella margaritifera Kahl, 1933
- Remanella microstoma Dragesco, 1953
- Remanella minuta Dragesco, 1954
- Remanella multicorpusculata Vacelet, 1961
- Remanella multinucleata Kahl, 1933
- Remanella obtusa Fauré-Fremiet, 1951
- Remanella rugosa Kahl, 1933
- Remanella swedmarki Dragesco, 1953
- Remanella trichocysta Dragesco, 1953
- Remanella unicorpusculata (Kahl, 1933) Dragesco, 1965
- Remanella unirugosa Hartwig, 1973
