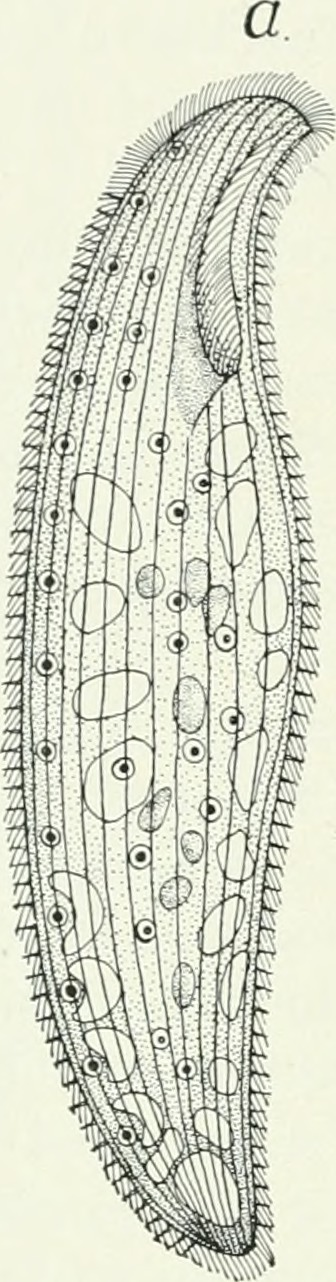
- Illustration of Loxodes rostrum

Scientific classification
- Domain: Eukaryota
- Clade: Sar
- Clade: Alveolata
- Phylum: Ciliophora
- Subphylum: Postciliodesmatophora
- Class: Karyorelictea
- Order: Loxodida
- Family: Loxodidae
- Genus: Loxodes; Ehrenberg, 1830

Species
- Several, including: Loxodes magnus; Loxodes penardi; Loxodes rostrum; Loxodes striatus

= Loxodes =

Genus of protozoans

Loxodes is a genus of karyorelictean ciliates, belonging to Loxodidae. It is the only known karyorelictean ciliate that lives in freshwater habitats. The genus is known for its distinctive morphology, including a relatively large, flattened body and unique nuclear structures. It is also known to exhibit fascinating behaviours, such as geotaxis and light sensitivity.

== Etymology ==
The term Loxodes derives from the ancient greek λοξός (loxós), meaning "oblique, tilted". According to Ehrenberg, who first described the genus, Loxodes means oblique and refers to the anterior margin of the ciliated lip of the organisms in this genus.

== Type species ==
Loxodes rostrum (Müller, 1773) Ehrenberg, 1830

== History of knowledge ==
Kolpoda rostrum was the first loxodid discovered and described. The genus Loxodes was first proposed in 1830. Ehrenberg moved Kolpoda rostrum into the genus Loxodes and set it as the type species. Research has explored the geotaxis of Loxodes species, while subsequent work has investigated their photosensitivity. Advances in molecular phylogeny have also provided deeper insights into the phylogeny of Loxodes . Over time, new species and subspecies have been described, including the recent discovery of the new species L. tziscaensis in Mexico. Discoveries, such as that of L. rex in both Florida and Thailand, previously only observed in Africa, have challenged the understanding of the distribution of what were thought to be endemic species.

== Habitat and ecology ==
Loxodes lives in freshwater habitats such as lakes and ponds, unlike other karyorelictean ciliates such as the other loxodid genus Remanella, which live in brackish-water or marine habitats. They feed on bacteria and protists such as microalgae. It is microaerobic, preferring low concentrations of oxygen, below 5% atmospheric saturation. It can also survive extended periods in anoxic water, where oxygen is absent. Under such conditions, Loxodes is able to use nitrate instead of oxygen as an electron acceptor for respiration. Nitrate respiration is rare among eukaryotes, and Loxodes was the first eukaryote known to have this capability. Loxodes is also sensitive to light.

Members of Loxodes are found in freshwater environments. They typically inhabit aquatic microhabitats, including sediment and water columns, where they feed on small microorganisms. They live in the hypolimnion and range from areas of low O_{2} concentration to anoxic conditions. They will move downwards toward lower O_{2} concentrations, where it is hypothesized that there will be less competition for food.

Loxodes have been shown to be able to conduct nitrate reduction, allowing them to switch from aerobic respiration to nitrogen respiration in anoxic conditions. Experiments have shown that in oxygen-poor conditions Loxodes produce nitrate reductase and have increased electron transport chain activity, indicating a switch in terminal electron acceptors from oxygen to nitrate. Evidence of high nitrite concentration colocalized with Loxodes further supports this conclusion.

It has been suggested that L. rostrum may form symbiotic relationships with the green algae Pediludiella daitoensis based on observations of L. rostrum containing many cells of this algal species. Other researchers have reported observing a different unidentified alga within L. rostrum. However, the nature of the relationship with P. daitoensis has not been resolved, with more recent research questioning if L. rostrum is merely feeding on this alga or if this is indeed some form of endosymbiosis. It has been established that many freshwater ciliates can contain as many as hundreds of algae within them, but determining if these organisms are symbiotic or are temporarily retained food has been difficult due to the difficulties in culturing many ciliate species, including Loxodes. Due to the difficulties in culturing these species, the specimens observed with algal cells within them have solely been collected from the wild already containing algal cells. It is thus not fully understood where they encounter the algae or how long they maintain them. It has been speculated that the alga may be maintained as UV protection or an O_{2} source in anoxic conditions.

There is evidence that in some cases, more than one species of Loxodes coexist in the same habitat where they have the same distribution in the water column. Observations suggest that they partition food resources by size, where the larger Loxodes species consume food particles that are too large for the smaller Loxodes species.

At least one species of Loxodes has been shown to release toxic compounds from its extrusomes as a defence mechanism to avoid being eaten by predators. Research has shown that when L. stratus was consumed by the catenulid flatworm Stenostomum sphagnetorum, it was regurgitated, and when it was extrusome deficient, it was regurgitated far less. Furthermore, extracted toxins from L. stratus extrusomes were shown to be lethal to S. sphagnetorum.

== Description of organism ==
=== Morphology ===
Loxodes are roughly oval and range in length from 70–657 μm and are typically between 20–220 μm in width. They are laterally flattened with the right side ciliated with dikinetids in bipolar kineties in anywhere from 5 to 84 lateral rows depending on species. There are only two bipolar kineties on their left side. There is an anterior oral aperture on the ventral side leading into a cytostome at the posterior of the aperture. The oral aperture forms a distinctive hook shape at the cell's anterior end, and the cell's posterior end is rounded. The oral aperture contains a single buccal kinety on the right and an inner and outer buccal kinety on the left. Additionally, there is a rectilinear intrabuccal kinety. Loxodes are transparent with yellow to brownish pigmentation.

=== Nuclear and cellular division ===
Like other Ciliates, Loxodes have macronuclei and micronuclei. However, in Loxodes, the fates and transfer of these nuclei during asexual division are unique compared to other Ciliates. In the sister class, Heterotrichea, both the macronucleus and micronucleus divide during asexual cellular division. However, in Karyorelictea, the macronuclei do not divide and are transferred wholly to daughter cells. Different Loxodes species have different numbers and groupings of the two nuclei types. In species such as L. rostrum, each cell has two macronuclei and one micronucleus. The two macronuclei are separated into the daughter cells when the cell divides. The micronucleus then goes through two rounds of mitosis. The two micronuclei from the second division differentiate into macronuclei. These divisions provide each daughter cell with a micronucleus and a second macronucleus. Similarly, species such as L. striatus have two pairs of nuclei, each pair made of one macronucleus and one micronucleus. When these cells divide, each micronucleus is divided into one micronucleus and one macronucleus. The remaining micronuclei then divide again to produce another micronucleus, thus providing each daughter cell with two new pairs of nuclei.

Loxodes species may have as many as 181 macronuclei and 138 micronuclei in similar arrangements, all following similar patterns of nuclear division. The nuclei can be found in groups containing at least one macronucleus and one micronucleus but often include many more of each. The macronuclei can range from being equal in number to micronuclei to being twice as numerous. As in other Ciliates, the micronuclei are diploid; however, the macronuclei are paradiploid instead of the usual ampliploid state in other Ciliates. The macronuclei degrade over time and are lost after relatively few rounds of cellular division. For example, in L. magnus, the macronucleus only lasts 3-7 divisions. It has been suggested that maintaining multiple macronuclei allows Loxodes to have higher numbers of transcripts that may be needed to have larger cells.

Loxode cells divide transversally, with the nuclei roughly evenly distributed between the daughter cells. Division timing is correlated with the number of macronuclei reaching a certain quantity within the cell.

=== Geotaxis ===
Both genera in the family Loxodidae have organelles known as Müller (or Müllerian) vesicles, which are involved in the sensing of gravity. They are about 7 μm across, and contain a membrane-covered mineral body known as a statolith. In Loxodes, the statolith is mostly composed of barium salts, compared to Remanella, where they are mostly strontium. Its structure and function resembles the statocyst of some animals. These vesicles are located on the dorsal rim on the left side of the cell in the cytoplasm and range in number from 2 to as many as 60. The vesicle is associated with basal granules, with one granule attached by cilia to the Müller vesicle like a stalk. It is thought that movement of the barium grain inside the vesicle is perceived by the cilia, allowing Loxodes to distinguish between up and down (geotaxis or gravitaxis), which it uses as a stimulus in addition to the oxygen concentration to orient itself in the water column. When oxygen concentrations are high, Loxodes tends to swim downwards, and vice versa.

=== Pigmentocysts ===
Loxodes have also been shown to contain yellow-brown pigment granules that are thought to act as photoreceptors that perceive increased light. Research has linked light perception in Loxodes with the partial pressure of O_{2}. Loxodes are thought to integrate light perception with geotaxis to position themselves in the water column.

The pigment granules have also been demonstrated to act as extrusomes that contain defence toxins. In addition to the experiments with S. sphagnetorum discussed above, Loxodes have been shown to release the contents of the pigment granules when they are attacked by the predatory ciliate Dileptus. Furthermore, it has been experimentally demonstrated that the contents of the granules damage the proboscis of Dileptus and can even be fatal.

=== Genetic code ===
Recent research has shown that members of the Loxodidae family, of which Loxodes is one of two genera, use a variation of the standard genetic code where the stop codons have alternate uses. UAA and UAG incorporate glutamine, and UGA is assigned to tryptophan or as a stop codon. This variant code is also used by other ciliates.

== Phylogeny ==
The most recent phylogenetic work using 18S rRNA has confirmed that Loxodes form a clade separate from the sister genus of Remanella within the Loxodidae family . This work has also shown that Loxodes species cluster in correlation with nuclear organization, with the species that have two macronuclei and a single micronucleus clustered in one group and the rest clustered in another.

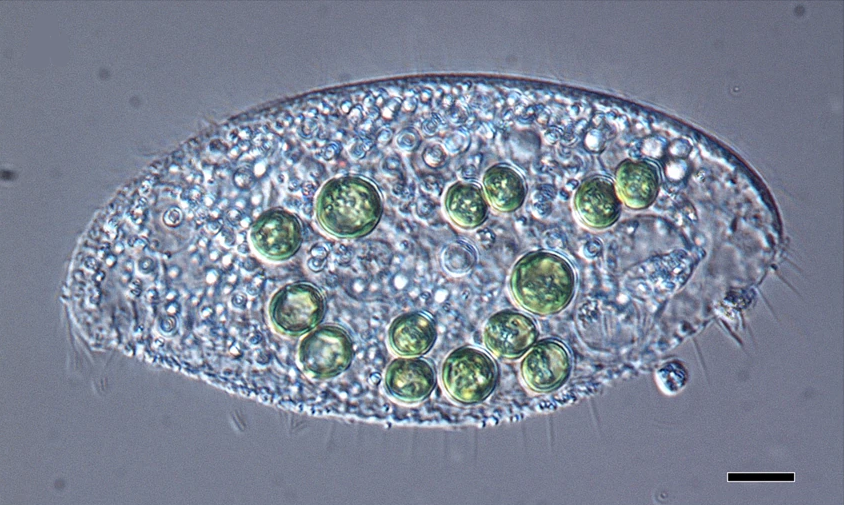
Species of Loxodes containing significantly large green-colored algae. Scale bar: 10 μm.

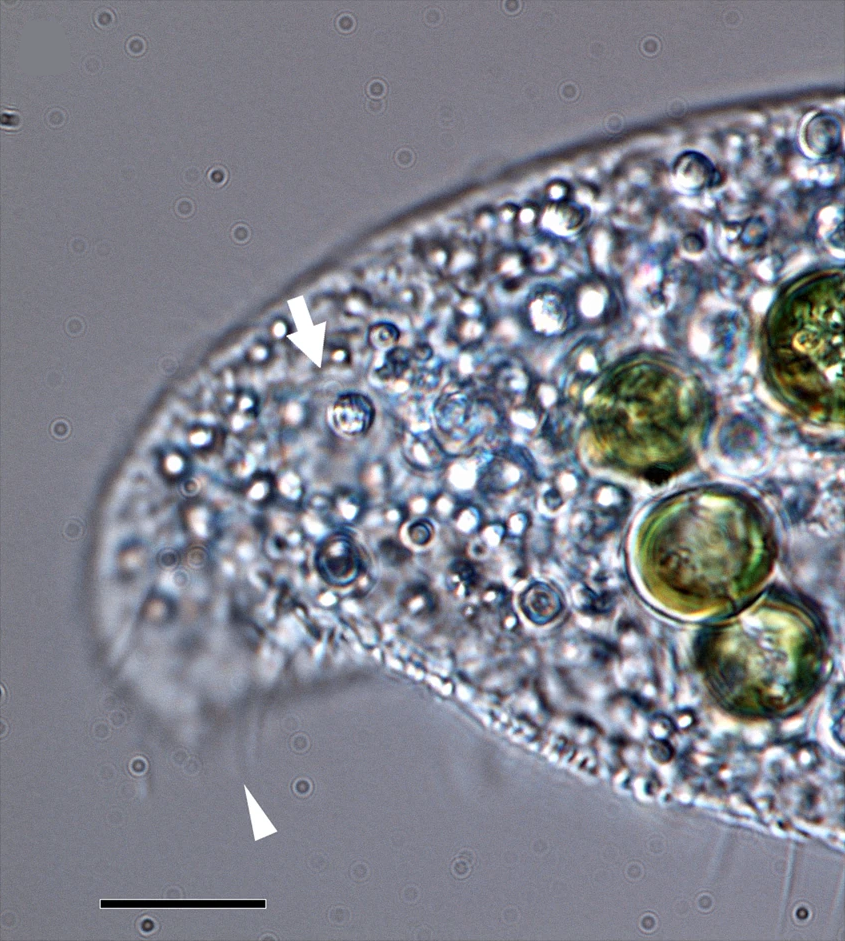
Detail showing a Müller vesicle (top arrow).

Loxodes ciliate eating a long cyanobacterium

== Cell cycle ==
Unlike other ciliates, the macronuclei of karyorelicteans do not divide. This was first observed in Loxodes by Otto Bütschli in the 1870s. It was later shown to be a distinctive feature of the class Karyorelictea in general. Experiments on Loxodes have shown that little or no DNA synthesis occurs in their macronuclei, and that the DNA content of a macronucleus is only slightly more than that of a diploid micronucleus ("paradiploid").

== List of species ==
- Loxodes kahli Dragesco and Njiné, 1971
- Loxodes magnus Stokes, 1887
- Loxodes penardi Kahl, 1931
- Loxodes rex Dragesco, 1970
- Loxodes rostrum (Müller, 1773) Ehrenberg, 1830
- Loxodes striatus (Engelman, 1862) Penard, 1917
- Loxodes tziscaensis Mendez-Sanchez, Mayen-Estrada and Ramirez-Corona, 2022
- Loxodes vorax Stokes 1884

== Practical importance ==
Research into Loxodes has been important as a model organism for increasing scientific understanding of Karyorelictids. Loxodes' adaptation to freshwater makes them easier to culture, thus making them useful for studying the cellular features and behaviours of these Karyorelictids as well as other related Ciliates. Despite the comparative ease of culturing compared to other karyorelictids, Loxodes are still quite difficult to culture. Research continues to work to improve culturing, fixation, and staining techniques to aid future research. These advancements demonstrate the usefulness of Loxodes as a model organism for investigating new scientific methods for working with other organisms that are difficult to culture, such as other marine Ciliates.
