= Geleia =

Scientific classification
- Domain: Eukaryota
- Clade: Diaphoretickes
- Clade: SAR
- Clade: Alveolata
- Phylum: Ciliophora
- Subphylum: Postciliodesmatophora
- Class: Karyorelictea
- Order: Protoheterotrichida
- Family: Geleiidae
- Genus: Geleia (Kahl 1933) Foissner, 1998

Species
- See text.

Genus of protists in the ciliates phylum

Geleia is a genus of karyorelict ciliates in the family Geleiidae.

The genus name is a taxonomic patronym honoring the Hungarian protistologist József von Gelei (1885-1952).

== Systematics ==
17 species are currently described in the genus Geleia.

- Geleia acuta Dragesco, 1960
- Geleia decolor Kahl, 1933
- Geleia filiformes Nouzarède, 1976
- Geleia fossata Kahl, 1933 is the type species of the genus.
- Geleia heterotricha Dragesco, 1960, redescribed as Gellertia heterotricha Dragesco, 1999
- Geleia hyalina Dragesco, 1960
- Geleia luci Dragesco, 1960
- Geleia major Dragesco, 1954
- Geleia martinicense Nouzarède, 1976
- Geleia murmanica Raikov, 1962
- Geleia nigriceps Kahl, 1933
- Geleia obliqua Dragesco, 1960
- Geleia orbis Fauré-Fremiet, 1951
- Geleia simplex Fauré-Fremiet, 1951
- Geleia swedmarki Dragesco
- Geleia tenuis Dragesco, 1954
- Geleia vacuolata Dragesco, 1960

== Phylogeny ==
Comparison and phylogenetic analysis of 18S rRNA sequences showed that Geleia is the sister group to a clade grouping Parduczia orbis with Corlissina maricaensis.
