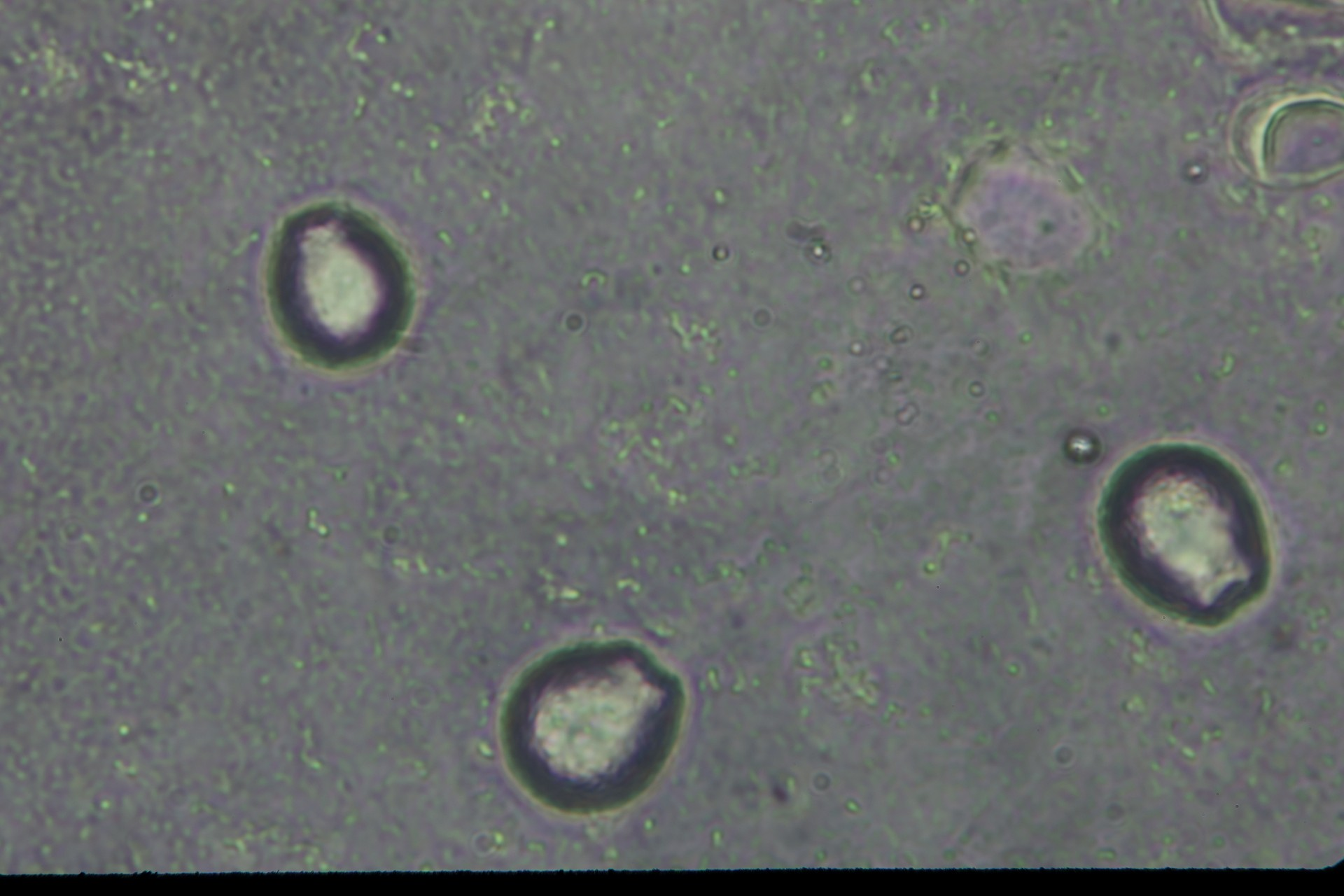
- Tests of Cryptodifflugia operculata organism

Scientific classification
- Domain: Eukaryota
- Phylum: Amoebozoa
- Class: Tubulinea
- Order: Arcellinida
- Family: Cryptodifflugiidae
- Genus: Cryptodifflugia
- Species: C. operculata

Binomial name
- Cryptodifflugia operculata Page, 1966

= Cryptodifflugia operculata =

Species of ameobozoan

Cryptodifflugia operculata is an amoebozoan in the Tubulinea class. They are testate amoebae due to the presence of a test that encapsulates its pseudopods. C. operculata's taxonomy has been categorized throughout the years, as well as its morphology. They are found mainly in freshwater, however they also can be found in soil. C. operculata is a predator that can consume prey larger than themselves, and is capable of forming packs and hunting.

== Ecology ==
Cryptodifflugia can be found in various places worldwide, such as ponds, mossy habitats, soil habitats, freshwater habitats, bogs, and mossy areas. Cryptodifflugia operculata will eat some bacteria and yeasts from their surrounding habitats.

== Morphology ==
Cryptodifflugia operculata has a small, rhizopod oval-shaped test, which is its shell. They also have pseudopodia, which they use to pull themselves around. They can usually be identified from their shell. Their shells are made of calcium phosphate and they are usually colorless or yellow. They can also be brown. The shell is also anchored by actin.

As previously mentioned, they are ovoid, and hyaline (transparent). They have a lens-shaped operculum in their aperture as well. Their pseudopodia usually have a rounded tip and there can be up to a few. They usually measure around 15.2 X 17.6 micrometers in dimension, but they can range from 15-25 micrometers. The organisms lack a contractile vacuole.

== Behavior ==
Cryptodifflugia operculata exhibit a few different distinct behaviors. The pseudopodia can be used for locomotion. The pseudopodia shorten and thicken irregularly to move around and pull the testate amoeba in the direction that they are moving. The organism's choice of food depends on whether they are found in water or in soil. C. operculata found in soil can hunt in packs, usually for bacterivorous nematodes. This is specifically for soil-borne C. operculata, as others have not yet been extensively studied. It has also been found that the shell of the amoeba is not just used for protection, it can also be used as a weapon when up against larger organisms.

== Taxonomic history ==
The genus Cryptodifflugia was first used to describe Cryptodifflugia ovioforms by Eugène Penard in 1880. Later, Cash discovered a different genus which he coined "Difflugiella" in 1904. The specific name he gave to the organisms with shells that he saw was apiculata . After further research it was determined that some of the Cryptodifflugia species had laterally compressed tests, meaning they were more flat than rounded like the operculata species. The discovery of this difference caused discourse within the scientific community. Cryptodifflugia operulata was then placed in Rhizopodea in 1845, subclass Lobosa in 1861, in the order Arcellinida in 1880, and later in the genus Cryptodifflugia in 1942. However, later this was resolved when Page stated that Difflugiella and Cryptodifflugia are synonymous.
