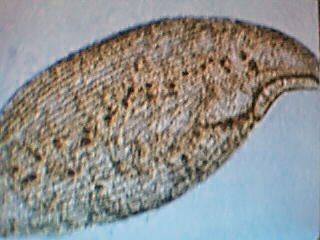
- Loxodes

Scientific classification
- Domain: Eukaryota
- Clade: Diaphoretickes
- Clade: SAR
- Clade: Alveolata
- Phylum: Ciliophora
- Subphylum: Postciliodesmatophora
- Class: Karyorelictea
- Order: Loxodida
- Family: Loxodidae; Bütschli, 1889

Genera
- Loxodes; Remanella

= Loxodidae =

Family of protists

Loxodidae is a family of karyorelict ciliates.

Loxodidae members possess an elongated, laterally flattened shape. They share two key characters: a beak-like anterior rostrum interrupting the perioral kineties, and peculiar cytoplasmic organelles named Müller vesicles.

The extensive development of lacunae of the smooth endoplasmic reticulum leads to strong vacuolization of the endoplasm. This feature is associated to a lack of contractile vacuoles in all loxodids.

The term Loxodidae derives from the ancient Greek λοξός (loxós), meaning "oblique, tilted".

== Gravitaxis ==
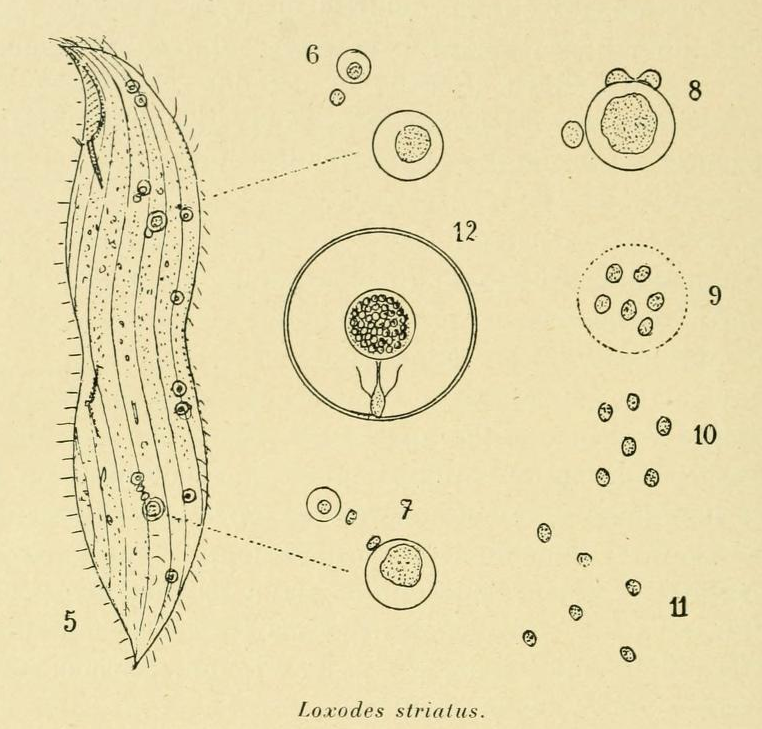
Drawing of Loxodes striatus during cell division (5), and its Müller vesicle (12) and nuclei in different stages of development (6–11)

Loxodidae members possess the ability to orient themselves in oxygen gradients. They use gravity as a stimulus for this spatial orientation, a phenomenon called gravitaxis or geotaxis.

Loxodid ciliates must therefore have developed mechanoreceptors informing them about what is up or down. A likely candidate structure for their gravitaxis is the Müller vesicle.

=== Müller vesicle ===
Müller vesicles (also known as Müllerian vesicles, or spelled Mueller) are statocyst-like organelles uniquely found in ciliates of the family Loxodidae. They are named after the Danish zoologist Otto Friedrich Müller. Eugène Penard was the first to propose that these vesicles were analogous to statocysts, which are the gravity-sensing structures of animals. Each Müller vesicle is spherical, about 7 μm across (in Loxodes), and is bounded by a membrane. It contains a Müller body, which comprises mineral concretions in an organic matrix bounded by a membrane, that is suspended in a vacuole by a stalk. The stalk is about 0.3–0.4 μm thick, and contains microtubules that connect the Müller body with the adjacent kinety, which is believed to help transmit the sensory signal to the rest of the cell. The mineral concretions are mostly salts of strontium in the genus Remanella, but barium in Loxodes.

== Phylogeny ==
Molecular phylogeny based on sequences of the SSU rRNA gene indicates that Remanella and Loxodes branch together into a monophyletic family Loxodidae.
