= Parduczia =

Scientific classification
- Domain: Eukaryota
- Clade: Diaphoretickes
- Clade: SAR
- Clade: Alveolata
- Phylum: Ciliophora
- Subphylum: Postciliodesmatophora
- Class: Karyorelictea
- Order: Protoheterotrichida
- Family: Geleiidae
- Genus: Parduczia; Dragesco, 1999

Species
- See text.

Genus of protists in the ciliates phylum

Parduczia is a genus of karyorelict ciliates in the family Geleiidae.

Parduczia species are filiform to serpentiform ciliates characterized by their giant size (1.2 to 2.5 mm on average) and their very long buccal split.

The genus name (Note: In some publications, the genus name is misspelt as "Parduzcia".) is a taxonomic patronym honoring the protistologist Béla Párducz (1911–1964).

== Systematics ==
Five species are currently described in the genus Parduczia.

- Parduczia arcachonense (Nouzarède, 1965) Dragesco, 1999
- Parduczia filiformis (Nouzarède, 1977) Dragesco, 1999
- Parduczia martinicense (Nouzarède, 1977) Dragesco, 1999
- Parduczia murmanica (Raikov, 1962) Dragesco, 1999
- Parduczia orbis (Fauré-Fremiet, 1950) Dragesco, 1999 is the type species of the genus.

== Phylogeny ==
Comparison and phylogenetic analysis of 18S rRNA sequences showed that Parduczia orbis is the sister group to Corlissina maricaensis. In turn, these two genera form a clade with Geleia.

== Alternative genetic code ==
An alternative genetic code is used by the nuclear genome of Parduczia sp. This code corresponds to the translation table 27 and involves the unusual reassignment of the three standard termination codons to sense codons:

| DNA codons | RNA codons | This code (27) | | | Standard code (1) |
|---|---|---|---|---|---|
| TAA | UAA | Gln (Q) | | | Ter (*) |
| TAG | UAG | Gln (Q) | | | Ter (*) |
| TGA | UGA | Ter (*) | or | Trp (W) | Ter (*) |
