= Gellertia =

Scientific classification
- Domain: Eukaryota
- Clade: Diaphoretickes
- Clade: SAR
- Clade: Alveolata
- Phylum: Ciliophora
- Class: Karyorelictea
- Order: Protoheterotrichida
- Family: Geleiidae
- Genus: Gellertia; Dragesco, 1999
- Species: G. heterotricha

Binomial name
- Gellertia heterotricha (Dragesco 1960)

Genus of protists in the ciliates phylum

Gellertia is a monotypic genus of karyorelict ciliates in the family Geleiidae. It contains a single species, Gellertia heterotricha.

The genus is on average 400 μm long and 60 μm in width. It is characterized by a very simplified adoral infraciliature, reduced to a row of two dikinetids (whereas the genus Geleia shows long polykinetids).

The genus name is a taxonomic patronym honoring the protistologist József Gellért.
