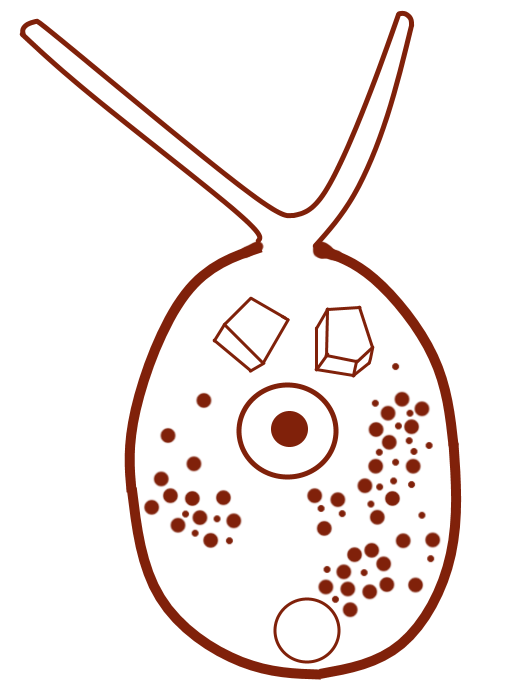
- A free-living Cryptodifflugia leachi cell housed in its rigid shell, extending its rhizopods through the pseudostomal aperture.

Scientific classification
- Domain: Eukaryota
- Clade: Amorphea
- Phylum: Amoebozoa
- Class: Tubulinea
- Order: Arcellinida
- Family: Cryptodifflugiidae
- Genus: Cryptodifflugia
- Species: C. leachi

Binomial name
- Cryptodifflugia leachi Nicholls, 2006

= Cryptodifflugia leachi =

Species of testate amoebae

Cryptodifflugia leachi is an aquatic species of testate amoebae discovered in 2006 in Canada, living in bottom sediment from wetlands at the base of the Niagara Escarpment.

== Description ==
Cryptodifflugia leachi is characterized by an oval, elliptical shell with a circular transverse section and a smooth surface. The shell ranks as one of the smallest out of the testate amoebae, with a length of 10–16 μm, a width of 8–12 μm and a very small pseudostomal aperture of 1.5–2.5 μm in diameter. Its pseudopodia are narrow and cylindrical, often reaching lengths up to 3 times that of the shell. Inside its cytoplasm there are often one or two large crystal-like refractive bodies in the anterior (closer to the aperture) region. When encysted, it develops an operculum, a thickened plug, and the cell membrane thickens behind it.

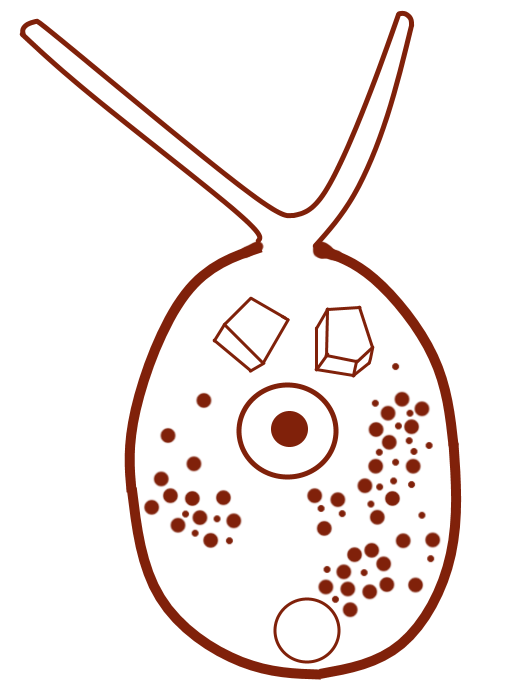
A free-living C. leachi cell extending its rhizopods.

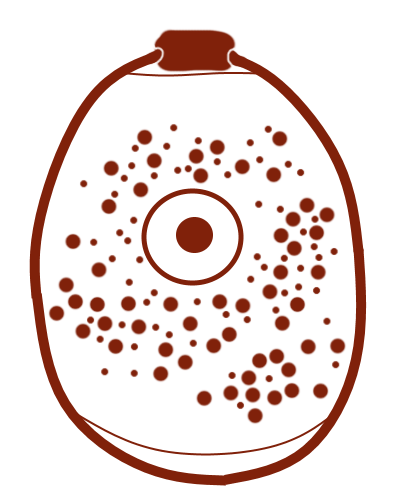
An encysted C. leachi cell with a developed operculum.
