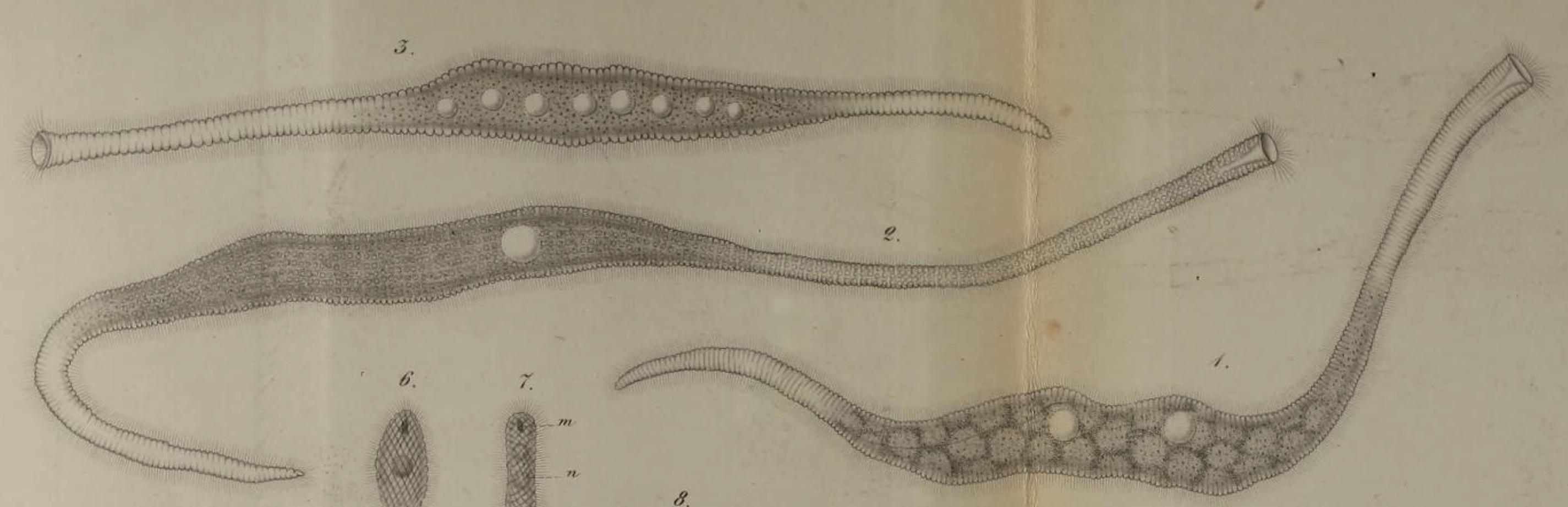
- Drawing of Tracheloraphis phoenicopterus by Ferdinand Cohn (1866)

Scientific classification
- Domain: Eukaryota
- Clade: Sar
- Clade: Alveolata
- Phylum: Ciliophora
- Class: Karyorelictea
- Order: Protostomatida
- Family: Trachelocercidae
- Genus: Tracheloraphis; Dragesco, 1960

= Tracheloraphis =

Genus of single-celled organisms

Tracheloraphis is a genus of ciliates in the family Trachelocercidae.

== Description ==
Like other members of the family Trachelocercidae, Tracheloraphis are relatively large (often >1 mm in length) ciliates with an elongated, worm-like shape, evenly-ciliated cell body, and a distinct "head and neck" region. The cytostome ("mouth", or oral area) is at the apex of the anterior end and is surrounded by cilia (circumoral ciliature). They are distinguished from other genera in the family by having a glabrous stripe, an unciliated area running longitudinally along one side of the body.

Tracheloraphis lives in the marine interstitial habitat, living in the water between sediment grains like most karyorelictean ciliates. They are mostly found in fine- to medium-grained sediment where the grain diameter is between 120 and 400 μm.

Although the "mouth" of the ciliate is usually assumed to be apical, it has been reported that Tracheloraphis can take up food through its glabrous stripe. However, subsequent research has shown that feeding does occur through the apical end in Tracheloraphis and a related genus Sultanophrys, although feeding via the glabrous stripe cannot be completely ruled out.

== Systematics ==
The genus was first defined by Jean Dragesco in 1960, with T. phoenicopterus (Cohn, 1866) (formerly Trachelocerca phoenicopterus) as the type species. At least 55 species of Tracheloraphis have been described.
