= Wilbertomorpha =

Scientific classification
- Domain: Eukaryota
- Supergroup: Alveolata
- Phylum: Ciliophora
- Class: Karyorelictea
- Order: Loxodida
- Family: Wilbertomorphidae; Xu Y., Li J., Song W., et Warren A., 2013
- Genus: Wilbertomorpha; Xu, Li, Song & Warren, 2013
- Species: W. colpoda

Binomial name
- Wilbertomorpha colpoda Xu, Li, Song & Warren, 2013

Genus of single-celled organisms

Wilbertomorphidae is a family of karyorelictean ciliates. The family is monotypic, because it contains a single genus Wilbertomorpha with a single known species, Wilbertomorpha colpoda.

Like most karyorelicteans, Wilbertomorpha lives in the marine interstitial habitat, between sediment grains. The cells are oval-shaped and about 45 μm long by 15 μm wide. Its distinctive features are a reduced oral apparatus ("mouth") and colorless granules of different shapes (rod-, cross-, and oval-shaped) in the cortex of the cell. Its phylogenetic relationship to other families of karyorelictean ciliates is unclear, because its morphology (ciliature) most closely resembles the order Loxodida, whereas molecular phylogenetics places it closer to the family Geleiidae. It was first collected from a beach at Qingdao, China. The name Wilbertomorpha was coined in honor of the German ciliatologist Norbert Wilbert.
