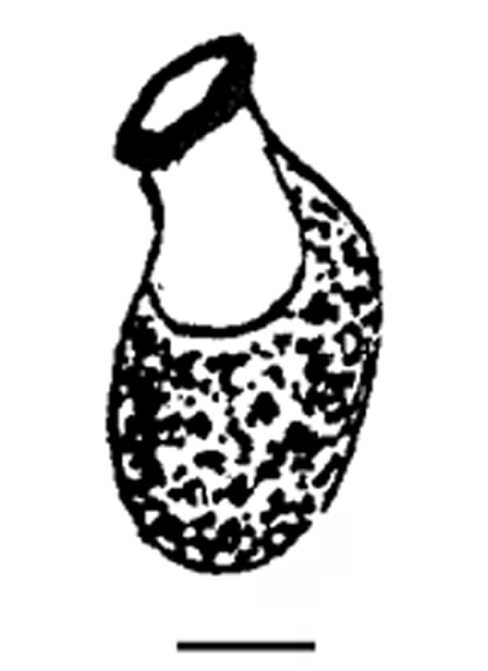
- Meisterfeldia turfacea

Scientific classification
- Domain: Eukaryota
- Clade: Amorphea
- Phylum: Amoebozoa
- Class: Tubulinea
- Order: Arcellinida
- Family: Cryptodifflugiidae
- Genus: Meisterfeldia; Bobrov 2016

Type species
- Meisterfeldia chibisovi Bobrov 2016

Species
- Meisterfeldia vanhoornei (Beyens et Chardez 1986) Bobrov 2016; Meisterfeldia turfacea (Zacharias 1903) Bobrov 2016; Meisterfeldia chibisovi Bobrov 2016; Meisterfeldia wegeneri Bobrov 2016; Meisterfeldia polygonia Bobrov 2016; Meisterfeldia bitsevi Bobrov & Mazei 2021

= Meisterfeldia =

Genus of testate amoebae

Meisterfeldia is a genus of arcellinid testate amoebae erected in 2016 that unites several new species as well as old species previously found in the genus Cryptodifflugia. Five of the newly described species were first found and isolated from subarctic tundra soil surrounding a river near Chokurdakh, Russia, while the last one, described in 2021, was recovered from tree hollows in Moscow.

== Description ==
Members of this genus are characterized by their ovoid, bilaterally symmetrical, laterally compressed tests. These tests are either colorless, yellow or brown, composed of proteinaceous material that lacks mineral particles. The test's aperture is circular, localized either in a ventrally subterminal position or a neck inclined vertically. Sometimes, the aperture's border shows a slight swelling.

== Taxonomy ==
The genus Meisterfeldia is named after the German protozoologist Ralf Meisterfeld. It encompasses 6 species described so far, distinguished from each other through the shape and size parameters of their tests:

- Meisterfeldia chibisovi Bobrov 2016 (type species)
- Meisterfeldia wegeneri Bobrov 2016
- Meisterfeldia polygonia Bobrov 2016
- Meisterfeldia vanhoornei (Beyens et Chardez 1986) Bobrov 2016 [basionym: Difflugiella vanhoornei Beyens et Chardez 1986]
- Meisterfeldia turfacea (Zacharias 1903) Bobrov 2016 [basionym: Cryptodifflugia turfacea Zacharias 1903]
- Meisterfeldia bitsevi Bobrov & Mazei 2021
