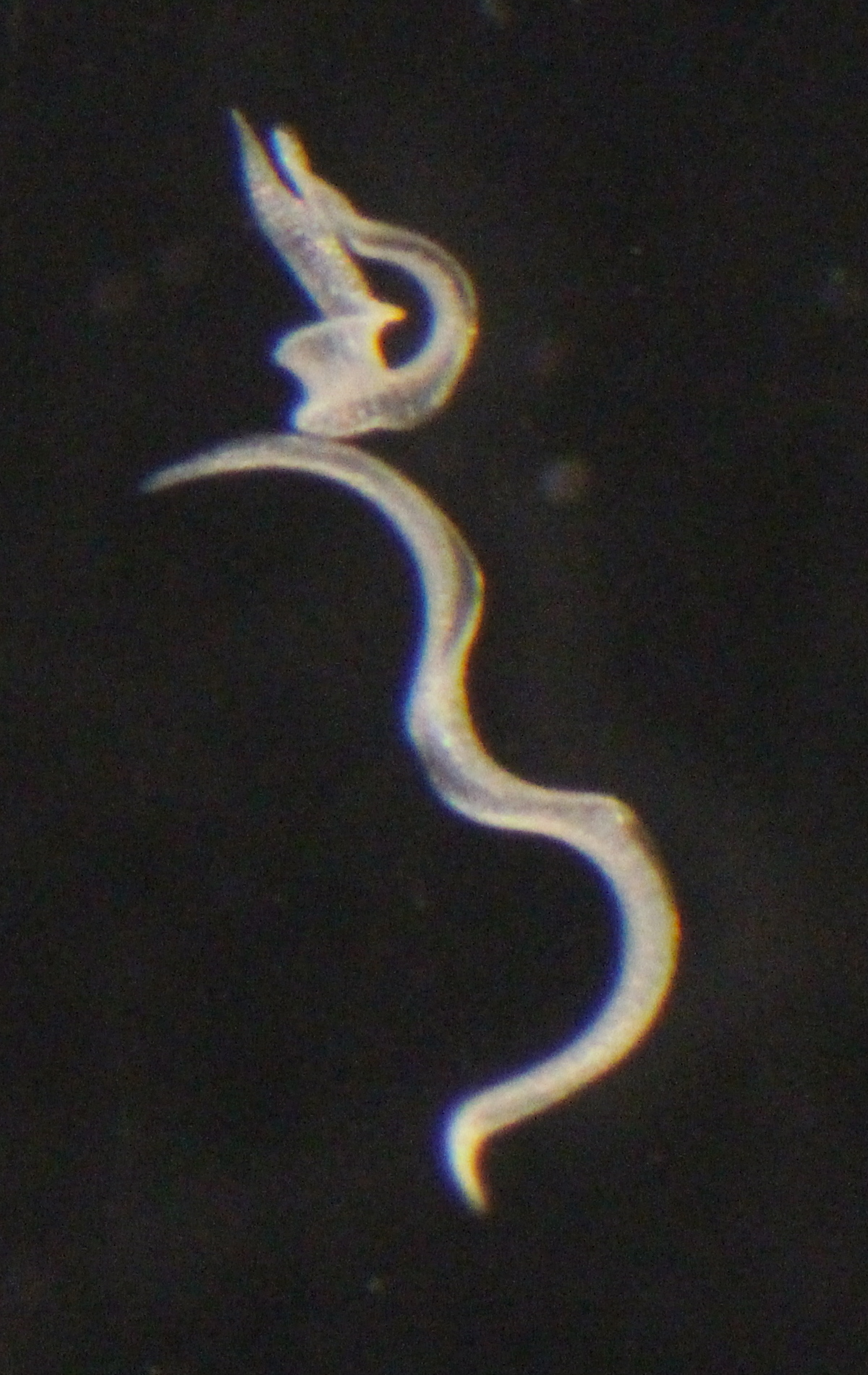
- Kentrophoros sp. from Isola D'Elba, Italy.

Scientific classification
- Domain: Eukaryota
- Clade: Sar
- Superphylum: Alveolata
- Phylum: Ciliophora
- Class: Karyorelictea
- Order: Protostomatida
- Family: Kentrophoridae; Jankowksi, 1980
- Genus: Kentrophoros; Sauerbrey, 1928

= Kentrophoros =

Genus of single-celled organisms

Kentrophoros is a genus of ciliates in the class Karyorelictea. Ciliates in this genus lack a distinct oral apparatus and depend primarily on symbiotic bacteria for their nutrition.

== Systematics ==
Kentrophoros is the sole genus in the family Kentrophoridae Jankowski 1980. The type species of the genus is K. fasciolatus Sauerbrey 1928, first described from the Bay of Kiel. Synonyms are Centrophorus Kahl 1931 (an illegitimate synonym because the name was already used for a genus of sharks) and Centrophorella Kahl 1935. Fifteen species of Kentrophoros have been formally described, although several of these names may be synonyms for the same species.

== Description ==
The ciliates are long and ribbon-shaped, like other karyorelictean ciliates that live in the marine interstitial habitat. In some species, the cell body is folded or involuted into a tube or more elaborate shapes. The ventral side is ciliated, while the dorsal side is mostly unciliated except for a single "circle kinety" at the margin. The dorsal side is covered with a single layer of symbiotic bacteria. Kentrophoros lacks a distinct oral apparatus, although densely-spaced kinetids associated with fibers (nematodesmata) at the anterior part of the cell may be vestiges of the oral apparatus. The number and arrangement of nuclei within the cell are also variable between species. Some species have only one micronucleus and two macronuclei, but others can have multiple clusters of macro- and micronuclei, or so-called "composite nuclei" where each cluster of macro- and micronuclei is enclosed in another membrane.

Kentrophoros live in coastal marine sediments, where they prefer the interface between oxic and anoxic layers.

== Symbiotic bacteria ==
The dorsal side of Kentrophoros is covered in a single layer of rod-shaped bacterial symbionts. These bacteria gain their energy from oxidizing sulfide, and unlike other sulfur-oxidizing symbionts, lack the genetic capacity to fix CO_{2} autotrophically into biomass; instead they appear to be entirely heterotrophic. The ciliates ingest the bacteria as their primary food source. This symbiosis has therefore been called a "kitchen garden" carried by the ciliates to feed themselves. The symbionts occupy about 50% of the total volume. They belong to a group in the Gammaproteobacteria for which the provisional name "Candidatus Kentron" has been proposed. Similar symbioses between eukaryotic hosts and sulfur-oxidizing bacteria include the ciliate Zoothamnium niveum, oligochaete worm Olavius algarvensis, and flatworm Paracatenula.
