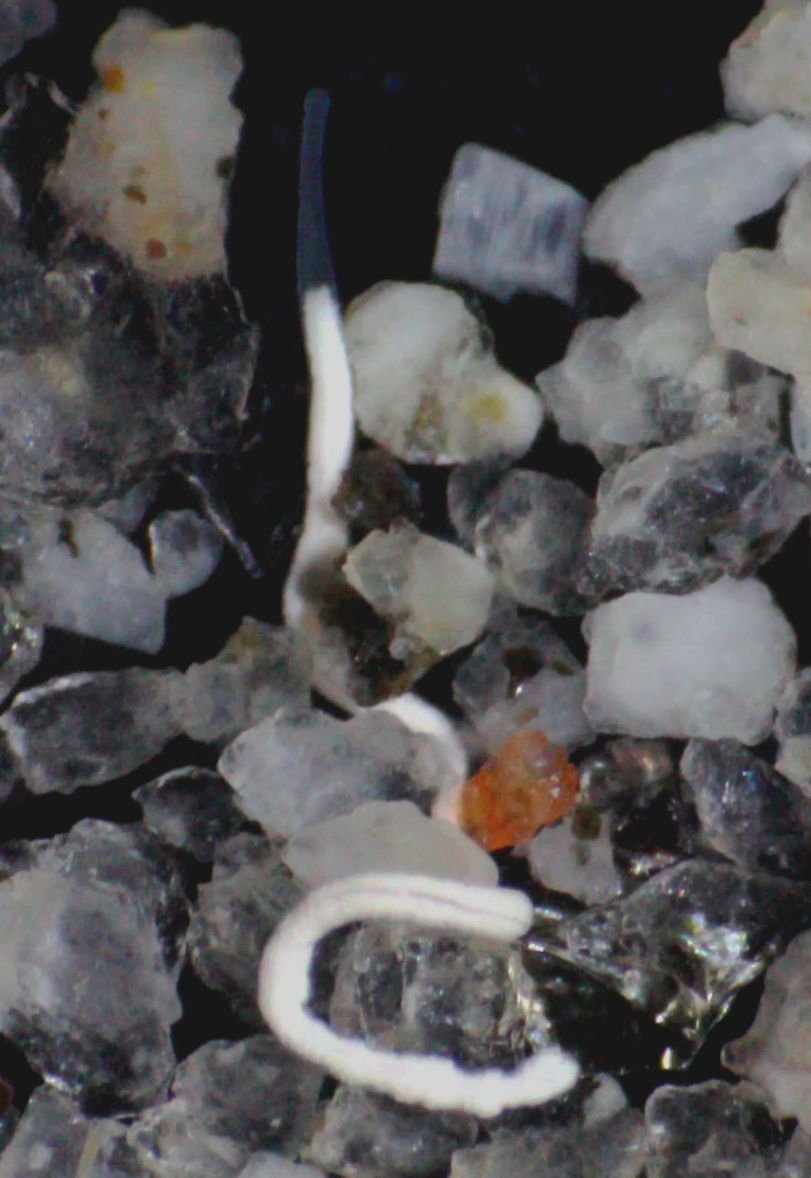
- Paracatenula sp. elegantly moving in the sediment. The white trophosome contains endosymbionts while the anterior transparent part of the worm, called rostrum, is bacteria-free

Scientific classification
- Kingdom: Animalia
- Phylum: Platyhelminthes
- Class: Catenulida
- Family: Paracatenulidae
- Genus: Paracatenula; Sterrer & Rieger, 1974

Type species
- Paracatenula urania Sterrer & Rieger, 1974

Species
- See text

= Paracatenula =

Genus of flatworms

Paracatenula is a genus of millimeter sized free-living marine gutless catenulid flatworms.

Paracatenula spp. are found worldwide in warm temperate to tropical subtidal sediments. They are part of the interstitial meiofauna of sandy sediments. Adult Paracatenula lack a mouth and a gut and are associated with intracellular symbiotic alphaproteobacteria of the genus Candidatus Riegeria. The symbionts are housed in bacteriocytes in a specialized organ, the trophosome (Greek τροφος trophos 'food'). Ca. Riegeria can make up half of the worms' biomass. The beneficial symbiosis with the carbon dioxide fixing and sulfur-oxidizing endosymbionts allows the marine flatworm to live in nutrient poor environments. The symbionts not only provide the nutrition but also maintain the primary energy reserves in the symbiosis.

== Diversity ==
Five species of Paracatenula have been described, named after muses and nymphs of the Greek mythology:

- P. erato Sterrer & Rieger, 1974
- P. galateia Dirks, Gruber-Vodicka, Leisch, Sterrer & Ott, 2011
- P. kalliope Sterrer & Rieger, 1974
- P. polyhymnia Sterrer & Rieger, 1974
- P. urania Sterrer & Rieger, 1974

Several more species have been morphologically and molecularly identified, but are not formally described. The best studied species are P. galateia from the Belize barrier reef and a yet undescribed species P. sp. santandrea from the Italian island of Elba.

== Distribution ==
Paracatenula are globally distributed in warm temperate to tropical regions and have been collected from Belize (Caribbean Sea), Egypt (Red Sea), Australia (Pacific Ocean) and Italy (Mediterranean Sea). They occur in the oxic-anoxic interface of subtidal sands and have been found in water depths up to 40 m.

== Anatomy ==
Paracatenula can reach a length of up to 15 mm and a width of 0.4 mm. Several larger species of Paracatenula, such as P. galateia are flattened like a leaf, while all smaller species are round. All Paracatenula species examined so far were found to harbor bacterial symbionts in specialized symbiont-housing cells that form the nutritive organ - the trophosome. The frontal part of the worms—the rostrum—is transparent and bacteria-free, and houses the brain, while the trophosome region appears white due to light refracting inclusions in the bacterial symbionts. Some species of Paracatenula such as P. galateia possess a statocyst with a single statolith.

== Life cycle and reproduction ==
Although Paracatenula produce sperm and eggs that can be very informative to differentiate between species, sexual reproduction has not been observed. Instead, the worms reproduce by asexual fission or fragmentation, a process called paratomy. Paracatenula worms have high regenerative capabilities and can regenerate a lost head including the brain within 10–14 days The bacteriocytes of dividing worms are split during the fission process and the population of symbiotic bacteria is distributed to the two daughter individuals.

== Host–symbiont relationship ==
Paracatenula host their symbionts within bacteriocytes in the trophosome. These bacteria, named Ca. Riegeria, belong to the lineage of Alphaproteobacteria forming a monophyletic group within the order Rhodospirillales and the family Rhodospirillaceae. The co-speciation between host and bacteria suggests a strict vertical transmission of the bacteria in which the endosymbionts are directly transferred from parents to their offspring. The symbiosis is shown to be beneficial for both partners. The lack of both a gut lumen and a mouth indicate that the host derives most of its nutrition from its symbionts, which have the potential for carbon dioxide fixation and sulfur oxidation. In return, the host provides its symbionts with a stable supply of electron donors such as sulfide and oxygen in a dynamic and heterogeneous environment. Furthermore, symbionts living intracellularly in the worms are protected from predation as well as competition for nutrients by other bacteria.

== Symbiont physiology ==
Despite having a reduced genome with roughly 1400 genes, Ca. Riegeria symbionts have maintained a broad physiological repertoire, which stands in contrast to all other reduced symbionts vertically transmitted for hundreds of millions of years. Ca. R. santandreae symbionts fix carbon dioxide, store carbon in multiple storage compounds and produce all necessary building blocks for cellular life, including sugars, nucleotides, amino acids, vitamins and co-factors.

== Host provisioning ==
Paracatenula lack mouth and gut, and are nutritionally dependent on their symbionts. In all other chemosynthetic symbioses the host acquires their nutrition by digestion of symbionts. In contrast to this, in Paracatenula, the symbionts cater their host by secreting outer-membrane vesicles (OMVs) and symbiont digestion is rare. With their massive storage capabilities and the elegant way of providing the nutrition via OMVs, the symbionts have been suggested to form a 'bacterial liver' and peculiar 'battery' in the integrated Paracatenula symbiosis
