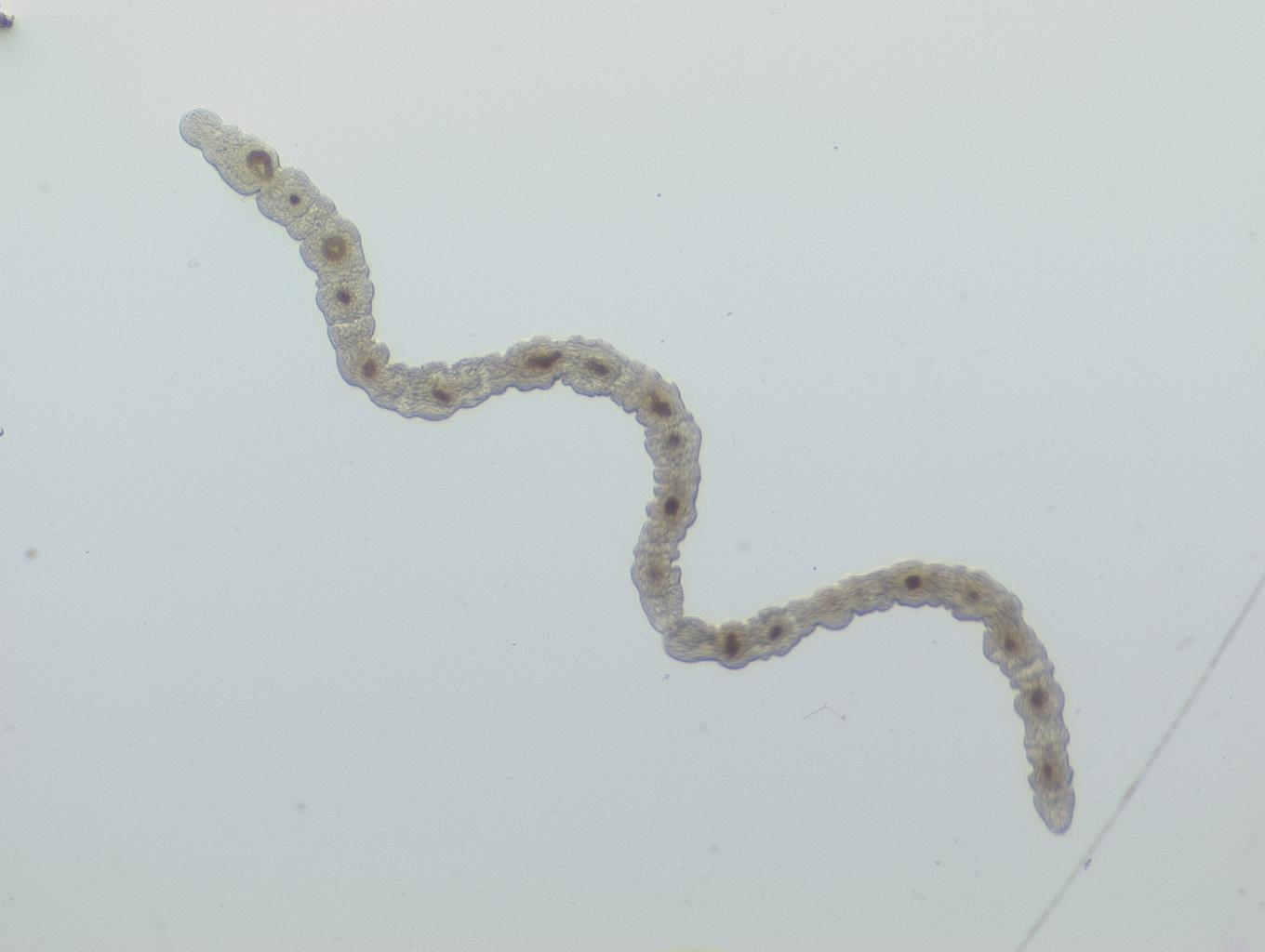
- Catenula lemnae
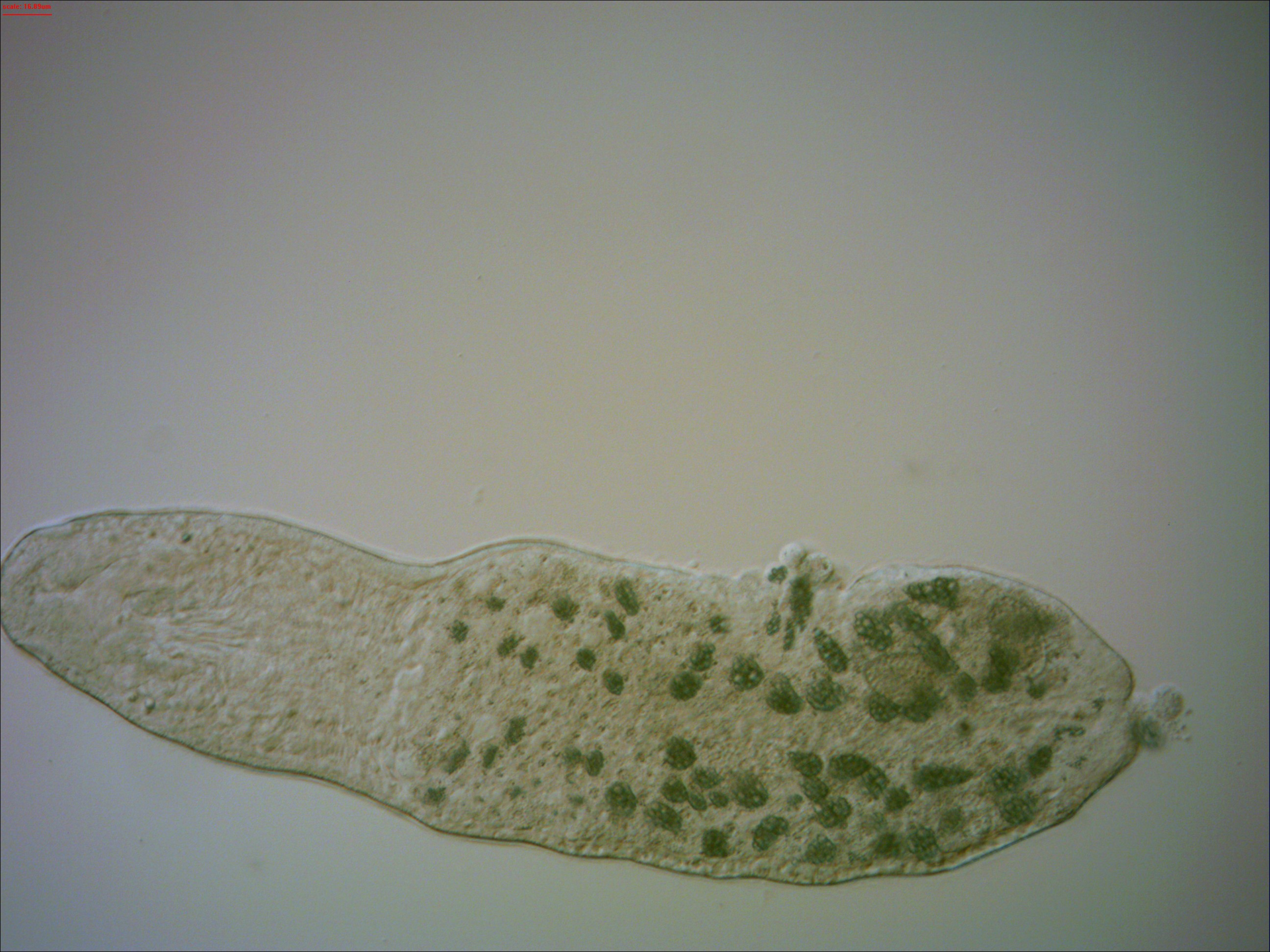
- Stenostomum simplex

Scientific classification
- Kingdom: Animalia
- Phylum: Platyhelminthes
- Class: Catenulida; Meixner, 1924

Families
- Catenulidae; Chordariidae; Retronectidae; Stenostomidae; Tyrrheniellidae

Synonyms
- Notandropora Reisinger, 1924

= Catenulida =

Order of free-living flatworms

Catenulida is an order of flatworms in the classical classification, or a class of flatworms in a phylogenetic approach. They are relatively small free-living flatworms, inhabiting freshwater and marine environments. There are about 100 species described worldwide, but the simple anatomy makes species distinction problematic.

== Description ==
The anatomy of catenulids is simple and lacks hard parts. The mouth is located anteriorly and connects to a simple pharynx and a simple intestine that forms a ciliated sac. They possess two pairs of nerve cords and often a statocyst, as well as a single protonephridium.

The gonads are unpaired. Unusually, the male gonopore opens on the dorsal surface of the animal, above the pharynx, while the female reproductive system lacks any of the usual ducts and related structures found in other flatworms. The sperm is nonmobile and lacks flagella or cilia. Asexual reproduction by paratomy is common, and it usually leads to a chain of organisms (zooids), hence the name, from Latin catenula, small chain.

Members of the symbiotic genus Paracatenula lack a digestive tract, and instead harbor intracellular chemoautotrophic bacterial symbionts that are assumed to provide their nutrition.

== Ecology ==
All catenulids are aquatic, benthic animals. Most of them live in freshwater, being usually very abundant in mires, ponds, streams and moist terrestrial habitats. A small number of species are known to live in the sea.

The diet of most catenulids consists of small invertebrates and algae that they capture from the water column. Others, such as those of the genus Paracatenula use chemoautotrophic bacterial symbionts that live inside their cells as a food source.

== Phylogeny ==
The monophyly of Catenulida is supported by molecular studies and by at least three synapomorphies: the unpaired protonephridium, the unpaired and anterodorsally located testis and the nonmobile sperm.

Although there are no known synapomorphies connecting Catenulida to other flatworms (Rhabditophora), molecular studies indicate that they are sister-groups. All characters common to both clades, such as the internal fertilization and the simple gut with a single opening, are found in other groups as well.
