= Geleiidae =

Scientific classification
- Domain: Eukaryota
- Clade: Diaphoretickes
- Clade: SAR
- Clade: Alveolata
- Phylum: Ciliophora
- Subphylum: Postciliodesmatophora
- Class: Karyorelictea
- Order: Protoheterotrichida
- Family: Geleiidae; Kahl, 1933

Genera
- Avelia; Corlissina; Geleia; Gellertia; Parduczia

Family of protists in the ciliates phylum

Geleiidae is a family of karyorelict ciliates. It is sometimes synonymized with family Aveliidae.

Geleiidae are very large ciliates (200 μm to 5 mm), with a cylindrical shape, and a thinner, often beak-shaped, apical region. They are characterized by a ventral oral region, with buccal infraciliature organized into one intrabuccal kinety and an extrabuccal row.

The family name is based on Geleia, the type genus.
