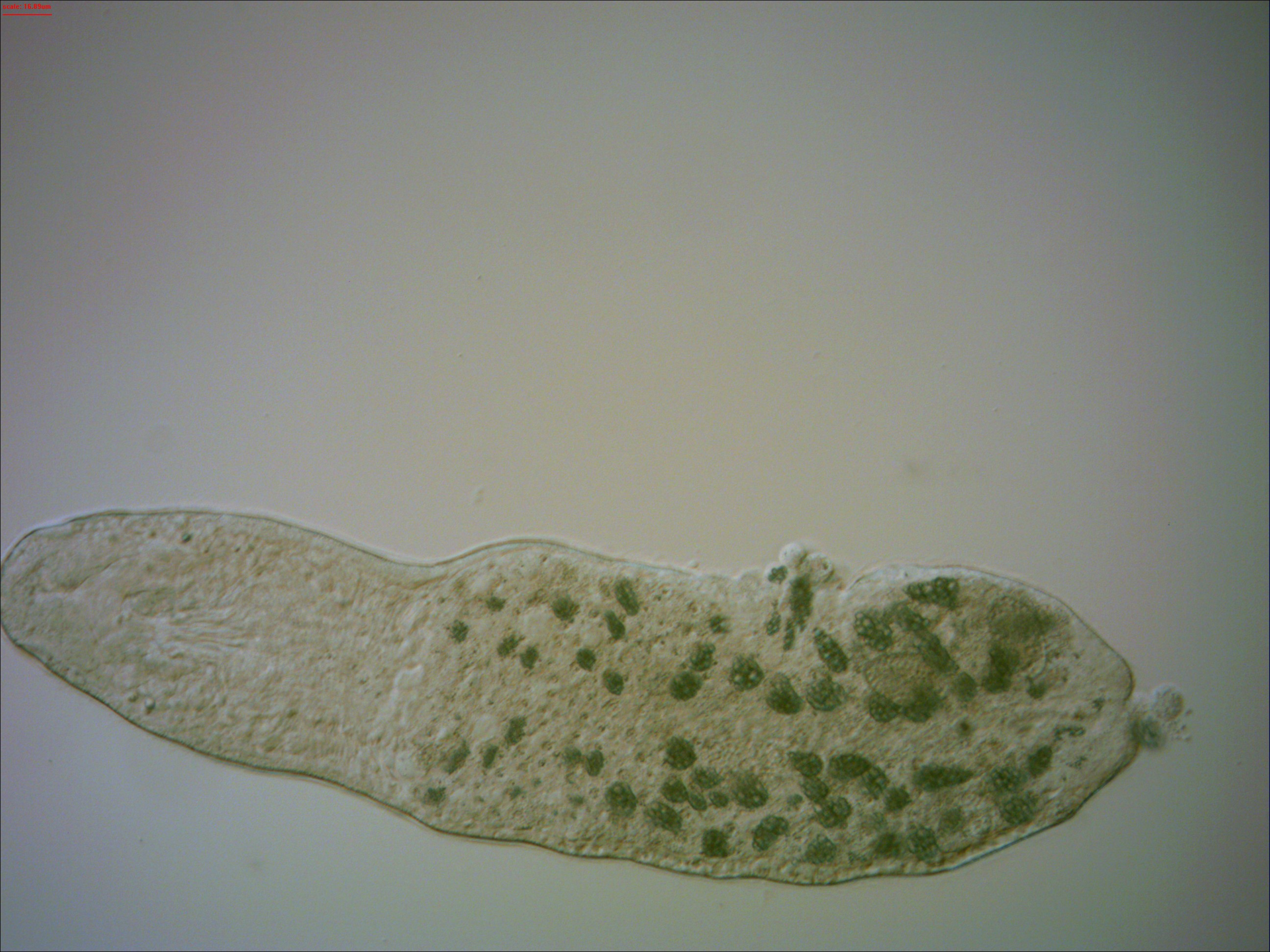
- Stenostomum simplex

Scientific classification
- Kingdom: Animalia
- Phylum: Platyhelminthes
- Class: Catenulida
- Family: Stenostomidae; Vejdovsky, 1880

Genera
- Myostenostomum Luther, 1960; Rhynchoscolex Leidy, 1851; Stenostomum Schmidt, 1848; Xenostenostomum Reisinger, 1976

= Stenostomidae =

Family of flatworms

Stenostomidae is a family of freshwater catenulid flatworms. It is the most species-rich family of catenulids, with about 70 species described, most of them in the Neotropics.

Catenulids of the family Stenostomidae are characterized by the brain divided into four clearly separated lobes, two anterior and two posterior, which lie near the mouth. The preoral zone contains a group of sensor cells with ciliated pits organized in long precerebral series.
