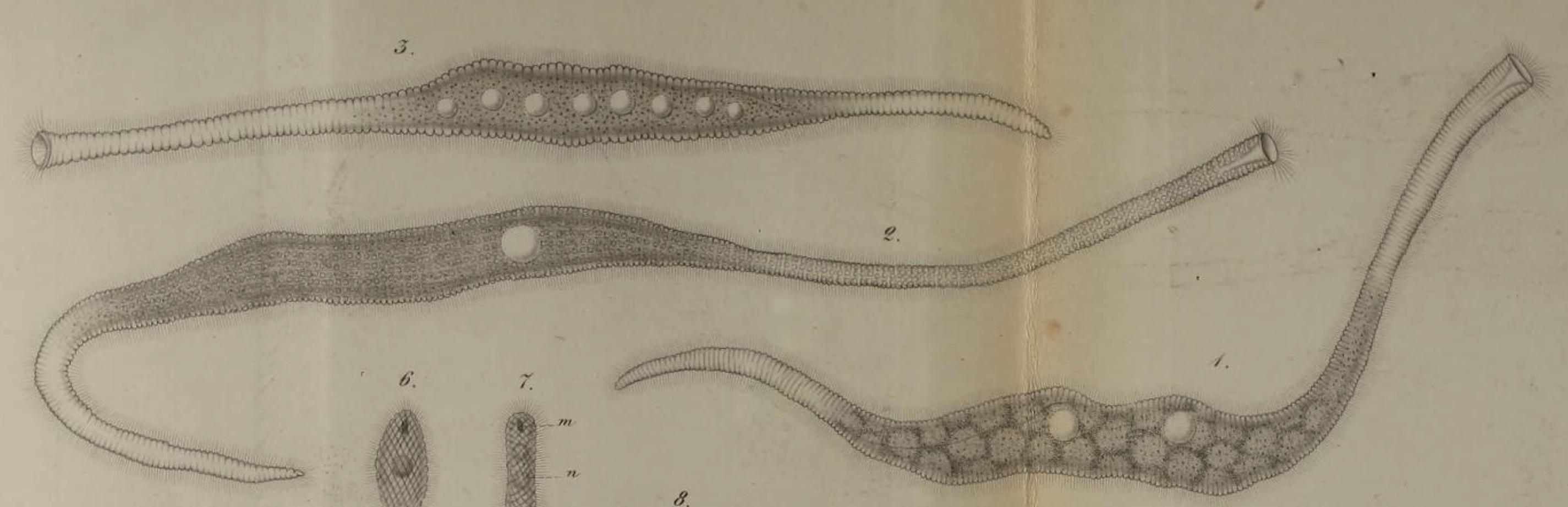
- Drawing of Tracheloraphis phoenicopterus by Ferdinand Cohn (1866)

Scientific classification
- Domain: Eukaryota
- Clade: Sar
- Superphylum: Alveolata
- Phylum: Ciliophora
- Class: Karyorelictea
- Order: Protostomatida
- Family: Trachelocercidae; Kent, 1881

Genera
- Prototrachelocerca Foissner, 1996; Trachelocerca Ehrenberg, 1830; Tracheloraphis Dragesco, 1960

= Trachelocercidae =

Family of single-celled organisms

Trachelocercidae is a family of ciliates in the class Karyorelictea.

== Systematics ==
Trachelocercidae is the largest family within the Karyorelictea with about 70 nominal species so far described.

== Description ==
Trachelocercids usually have an elongated body, which may be divided into head, neck, trunk and tail regions, an apical oral cavity, and most have several macronuclei and micronuclei arranged in nuclear groups
