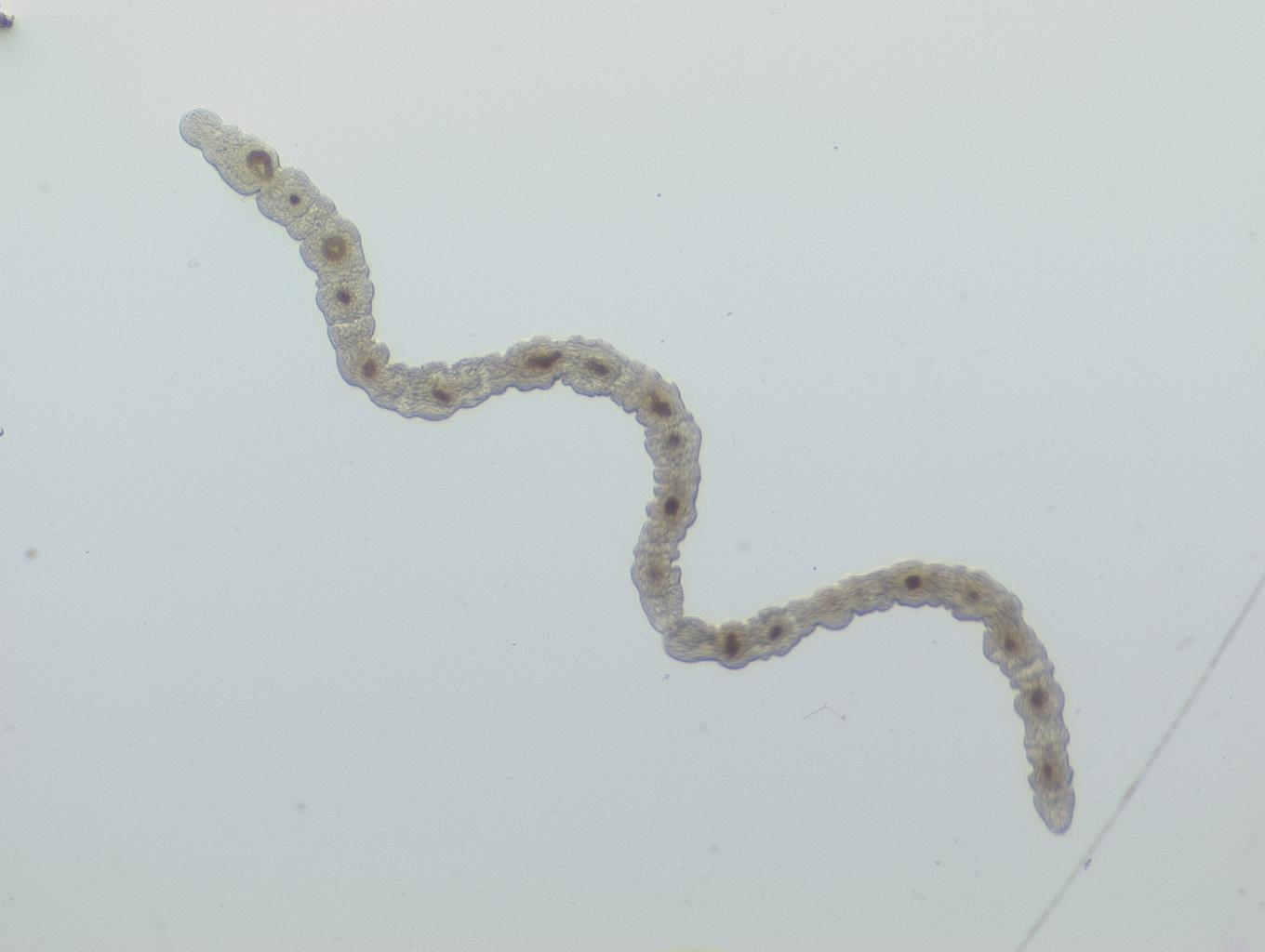
- Catenula lemnae

Scientific classification
- Kingdom: Animalia
- Phylum: Platyhelminthes
- Class: Catenulida
- Family: Catenulidae; Graff, 1905

Genera
- Africatenula Young, 1976; Catenula Duges, 1832; Dasyhormus Marcus, 1945

= Catenulidae =

Family of flatworms

Catenulidae is a family of freshwater catenulid flatworms.

Catenulids are characterized by an ovoid brain located in the preoral region. The brain lacks a distinct division into anterior and posterior lobes, although a constriction may occur.
