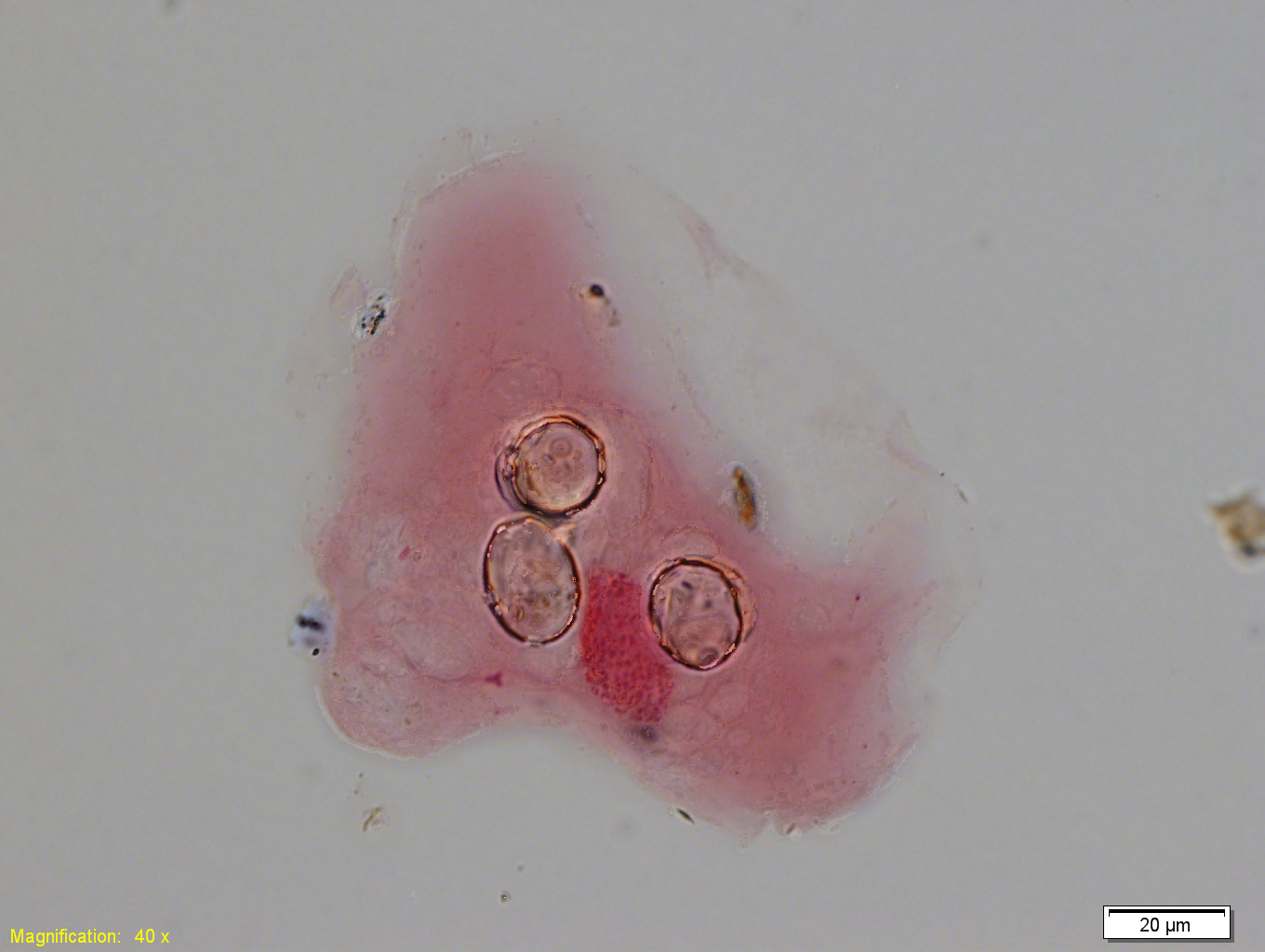
- Tests of Cryptodifflugia sp., from the Eugène Penard collection

Scientific classification
- Domain: Eukaryota
- Phylum: Amoebozoa
- Class: Tubulinea
- Order: Arcellinida
- Family: Cryptodifflugiidae
- Genus: Cryptodifflugia; Penard, 1890

Type species
- Cryptodifflugia oviformis Penard, 1890

Species
- 23 (see text)

Synonyms
- Difflugiella Cash 1904

= Cryptodifflugia =

Genus of testate amoebae

Cryptodifflugia is a genus of arcellinid testate amoebae. It contains all the species previously grouped as the genus Difflugiella, which is now a synonym of Cryptodifflugia.

== Description ==
Cryptodifflugia species are characterized by a shell with an oval egg-like shape with a short neck. Their surface is either smooth or adhering foreign particles. The shell can be colorless, yellow or brown, composed of an outer proteinaceous material that is usually lined. The shell's aperture is terminal, and has either a circular or an oval shape. They present pseudopods in the form of ectoplasmic anastomosing reticulopods, i.e. like fine threads that can branch or anastomose (meaning they can form links with each other) to create a dense network.

== Classification ==
The classification of the genus, as revised in 2017, identifies 23 species along with some subspecies:

- Cryptodifflugia angulata Playfair, 1917 – Australia
- Cryptodifflugia angusta (Schönborn, 1965) Page, 1966 – Bulgaria, Poland, Germany
- Cryptodifflugia angustastoma Beyens et Chardez, 1982 – Belgium
- Cryptodifflugia apiculata (Cash, 1904) Page, 1966 – England, Russia, Germany, Romania
- Cryptodifflugia bassini Bobrov, 2001 – Russia, Japan
- Cryptodifflugia brevicolla Golemansky, 1979 – Vietnam
- Cryptodifflugia collum (Chardez, 1971) Bobrov & Mazei, 2017 – Belgium, France
- Cryptodifflugia compressa Penard, 1902 – cosmopolitan
  - Cryptodifflugia compressa angustioris Tarnogradsky, 1959 – Caucasus, Belgium, Germany, Spitsbergen
  - Cryptodifflugia compressa australis Playfair, 1917 – Australia
  - Cryptodifflugia compressa ovata Playfair, 1917 – Australia
- Cryptodifflugia crenulata Playfair, 1917 – cosmopolitan
  - Cryptodifflugia crenulata glabra (Schönborn, 1965) Bobrov & Mazei, 2017 – Germany, Poland
  - Cryptodifflugia crenulata globosa Playfair, 1917 – Australia, Poland, Germany, Greenland, Romania, Vietnam, South Georgia, Île de la Possession, Îles Crozet
- Cryptodifflugia horrida Page, 1966 – Bulgaria, Germany, Poland, Czech Republic, Spitsbergen, Vietnam
- Cryptodifflugia lanceolata Golemansky, 1970 – cosmopolitan
- Cryptodifflugia leachi Nicholls, 2006 – Canada
- Cryptodifflugia minuta (Playfair, 1917) Bobrov & Mazei, 2017 – Australia, Russia, Greenland, United States of America, Île de la Possession, Îles Crozet
- Cryptodifflugia operculata Page, 1966 – cosmopolitan
- Cryptodifflugia oviformis Penard, 1890 – cosmopolitan
  - Cryptodifflugia oviformis fusca (Penard, 1890) Bonnet et Thomas, 1956 – cosmopolitan
- Cryptodifflugia paludosa Golemansky, 1981 – Black Sea
- Cryptodifflugia patinata (Schönborn, 1964) Bobrov & Mazei, 2017 – Germany, Poland
- Cryptodifflugia psammophila (Golemansky, 1970) Bobrov & Mazei, 2017 – Baltic Sea, Black Sea, Mediterranean Sea, Caribbean Sea, Atlantic Ocean, Pacific Ocean
- Cryptodifflugia pusilla Playfair, 1917 – cosmopolitan
  - Cryptodifflugia pusilla conica Playfair, 1917 – Australia
- Cryptodifflugia sacculus (Penard, 1902) Deflandre, 1953 – cosmopolitan
  - Cryptodifflugia sacculus sakotschawi Tarnogradsky, 1959 – Caucasus
- Cryptodifflugia splendida (Schönborn, 1965) Page, 1966 – Poland, Germany
- Cryptodifflugia valida Playfair, 1917 – Australia, Chile
- Cryptodifflugia voigti Schmidt, 1926 – Germany, Russia, Belgium, Romania
- Cryptodifflugia vulgaris (Francé, 1913) Volz, 1928 – Germany, Bulgaria, Russia

=== Excluded taxa ===
Several taxa previously accredited to Cryptodifflugia or Difflugiella have been excluded from the 2017 revision:

- Difflugiella heynigi Schönborn, 1965 and Cryptodifflugia lamingerae Chardez, 1977 do not match the description of the genus because they are larger and characterized by an apical aboral end of the shell and a prominent long neck with collar; it is possible that these two species will soon be included in the genus Chardezia instead.
- Cryptodifflugia sakotschawi and C. kelensis were mentioned by Tarnogradsky in 1945 but their descriptions were never published.
- Cryptodifflugia turfacea Zacharias, 1903 and C. vanhoornei Beyens et Chardez, 1987 are thought to be more probably a different genus because they're characterized by a retort-shaped shell.
