= Harlequin color change =

Cutaneous condition in newborns

Harlequin color change is a cutaneous condition seen in newborn babies characterized by momentary red color changes of half the child, sharply demarcated at the body's midline. This transient change occurs in approximately 10% of healthy newborns. It is seen usually between two and five days of birth. The condition lasts from 30 seconds to 20 minutes and then fades. It may recur when the infant is placed on their side, as the intensity of color has been shown to be gravity dependent and considerably variable from one infant to another.

The dark red color skin of the newborn with harlequin signs indicates polycythemia. Polycythemia is common in preterm infants because of the presence of fetal red blood cells (RBCs). The condition is also often seen in healthy newborns although associations like with prematurity, low birth weight, hypoxia, systemic use of prostaglandin E1, or intracranial injury, meningitis and anesthesia have been mentioned in the literature. Probable differential diagnosis are Port-wine stain and nascent hemangioma of infancy, but these can be differentiated due to transient nature of this condition.

Hypothesized pathogenesis involves temporary imbalance in the tone of cutaneous blood vessels secondary to hypothalamic immaturity.

This condition was first described by Neligan and Strang in 1952 and was named so.

== See also ==
- List of cutaneous conditions
