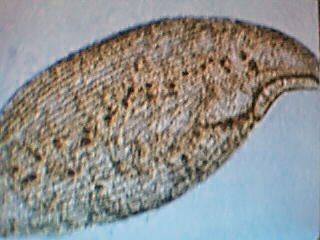
- Loxodes

Scientific classification
- Domain: Eukaryota
- Clade: Sar
- Clade: Alveolata
- Phylum: Ciliophora
- Class: Karyorelictea
- Order: Loxodida; Jankowksi, 1980

Families
- Cryptopharyngidae; Kentrophoridae; Loxodidae; Wilbertomorphidae

= Loxodida =

Order of protists in the ciliates phylum

Loxodida is an order of karyorelict ciliates.

The term Loxodida derives from the ancient Greek λοξός (loxós), meaning "oblique, tilted".
