= Avela =

Scientific classification
- Kingdom: Animalia
- Phylum: Arthropoda
- Class: Insecta
- Order: Lepidoptera
- Superfamily: Noctuoidea
- Family: Erebidae
- Subfamily: Arctiinae
- Tribe: Lithosiini
- Genus: Avela; Walker, 1856
- Species: A. diversa

Binomial name
- Avela diversa Walker, 1856

Genus of moths

Avela is a genus of moths in the subfamily Arctiinae. It contains the single species Avela diversa, which is found in Brazil.
