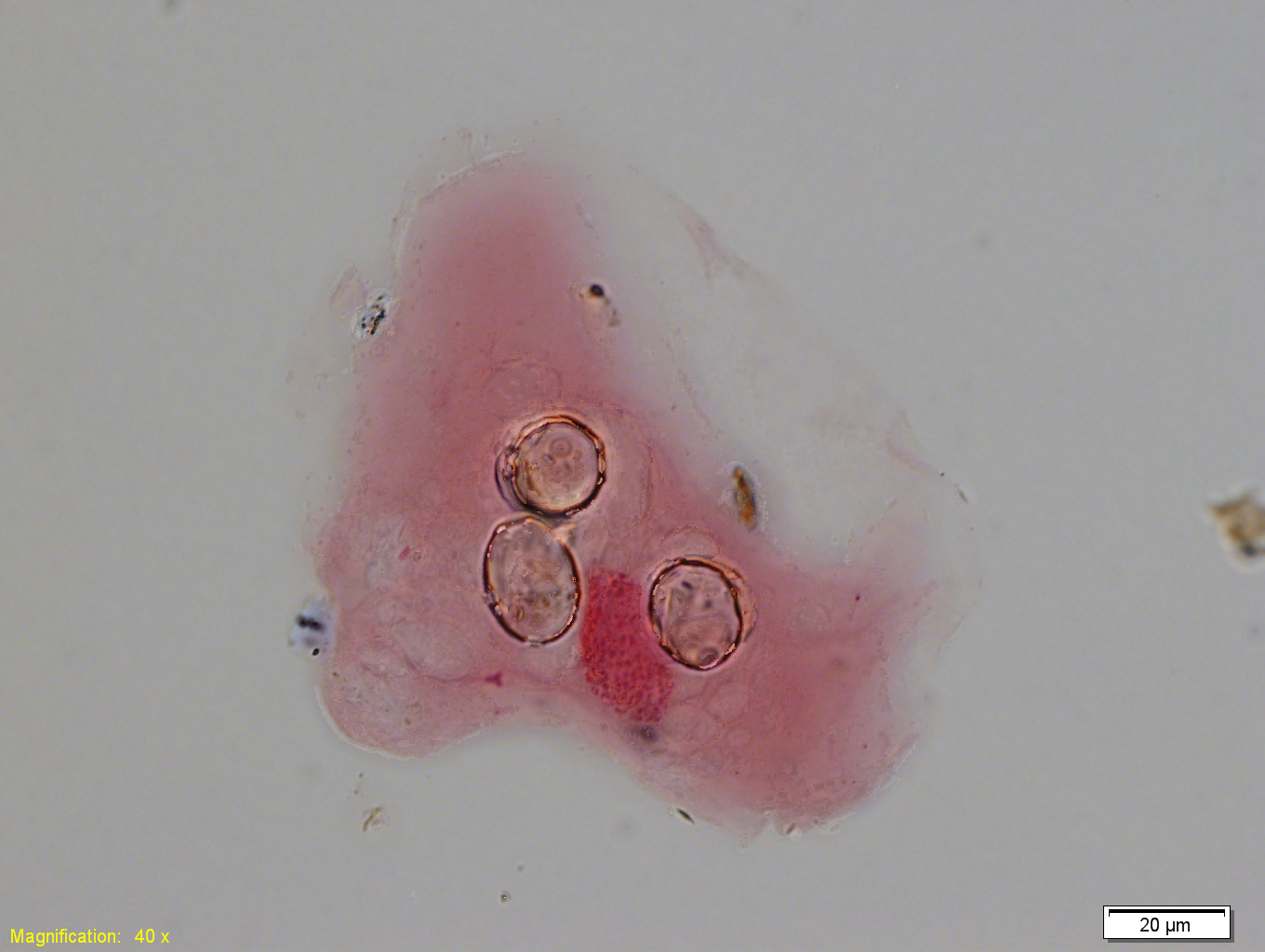
- Tests of Cryptodifflugia sp., from the Eugène Penard collection

Scientific classification
- Domain: Eukaryota
- Clade: Amorphea
- Phylum: Amoebozoa
- Class: Tubulinea
- Order: Arcellinida
- Suborder: Phryganellina
- Family: Cryptodifflugiidae; Jung, 1942

Genera
- Cryptodifflugia Cash 1904; Meisterfeldia Bobrov 2016; Wailesella Deflandre 1928

= Cryptodifflugiidae =

Family of testate amoebae

Cryptodifflugiidae is a family of arcellinid testate amoebae.

== Description ==
Members of this family are conopodous (with conical pseudopods) amoebae with the body in a clear, usually firm, vase-shaped test, and conical pseudopods for locomotion that extend separately from the opening of the test.

== Classification ==
The classification of the family, as of 2019:

- Infraorder Phryganellina Bovee 1985
  - Family Cryptodifflugiidae Penard 1890
    - Cryptodifflugia Cash 1904 – 23 species
    - Meisterfeldia Bobrov 2016 – 6 species
    - Wailesella Deflandre 1928 – 1 species

The 2022 classification places Meisterfeldia and Wailesella as Arcellinida incertae sedis, leaving Cryptodifflugia as the sole member of the family.
