= Protoheterotrichida =

Scientific classification
- Domain: Eukaryota
- Clade: Sar
- Clade: Alveolata
- Phylum: Ciliophora
- Subphylum: Postciliodesmatophora
- Class: Karyorelictea
- Order: Protoheterotrichida; Nouzarède, 1977

Families
- Geleiidae

Synonyms
- Aveliidae

Order of protists in the ciliates phylum

Protoheterotrichida is an order of karyorelict ciliates. It contains the family Geleiidae.

The term Protoheterotrichida derives from the three ancient Greek words πρῶτος (prôtos), meaning "first, earliest, most prominent", ἕτερος (héteros), meaning "another, different", and θρίξ, τριχός (thríx, trikhós), meaning "hair", in reference to the potential evolutionary affinities of these ciliates with the heterotrichs.
