= Eugène Penard =

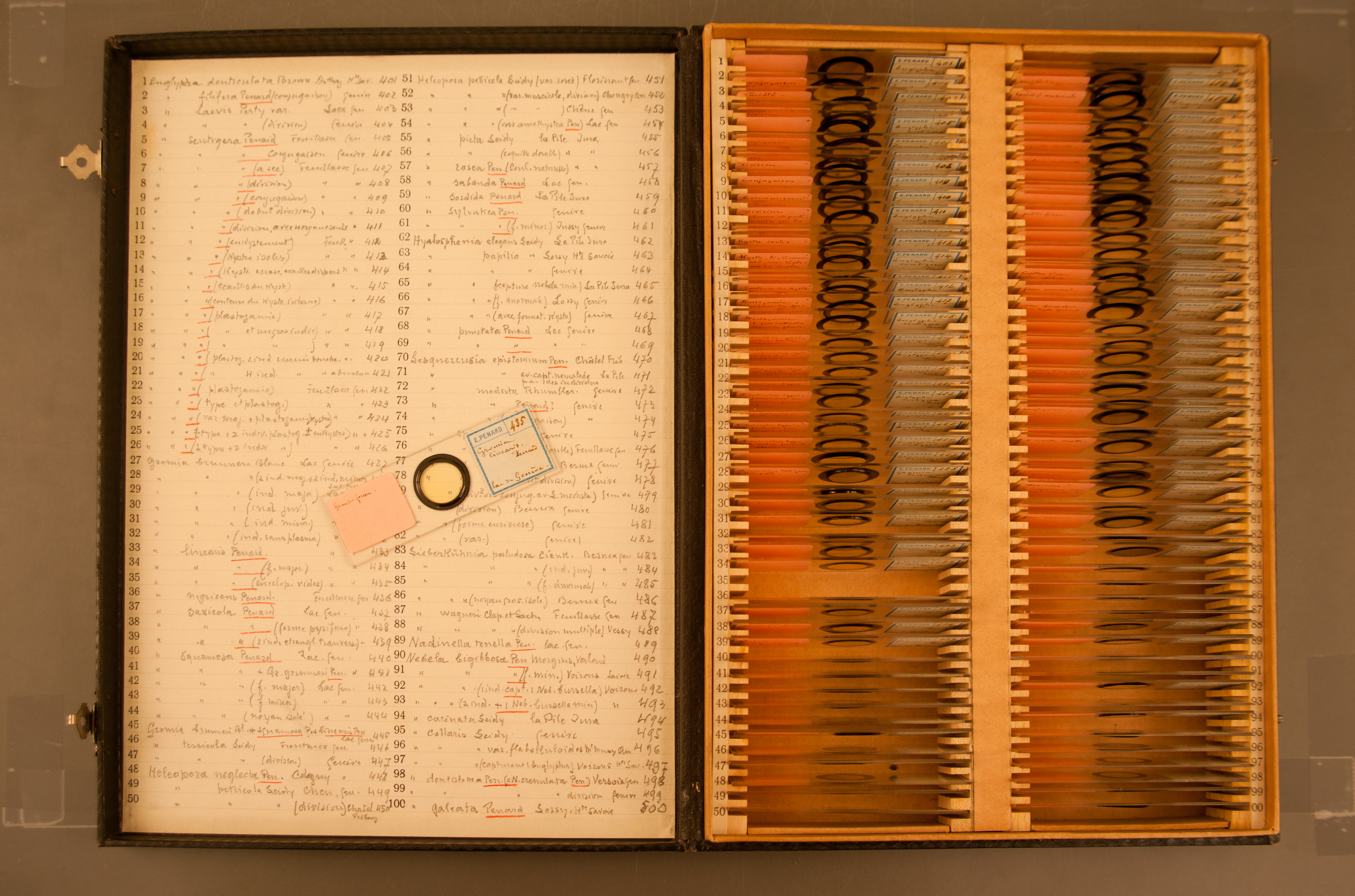
Collection Pénard

Eugène Penard (16 September 1855 – 5 January 1954) was a Swiss biologist and pioneer in systematics of the amoebae.

Penard was born in Geneva where his father ran a private school. After studying in Geneva, Eugène worked in a bank but decided to pursue science and went to the University of Edinburgh followed by studies at the University of Heidelberg under Otto Bütschli. He then became a student of Karl Vogt in Geneva from 1882 with a break serving as a private tutor to Prince Orlov in St. Petersburg from 1883 to 1886. He began to study protists and received a doctorate in 1887 for his studies on Ceratium hirundinella. He then spent some years as a private tutor in Germany in the Baron Belevski household. He then travelled and collected around the world and returned to Geneva in 1900. He then began to conduct studies and described nearly 530 new species of microscopic organisms before his eyesight prevented him from microscopic studies.
