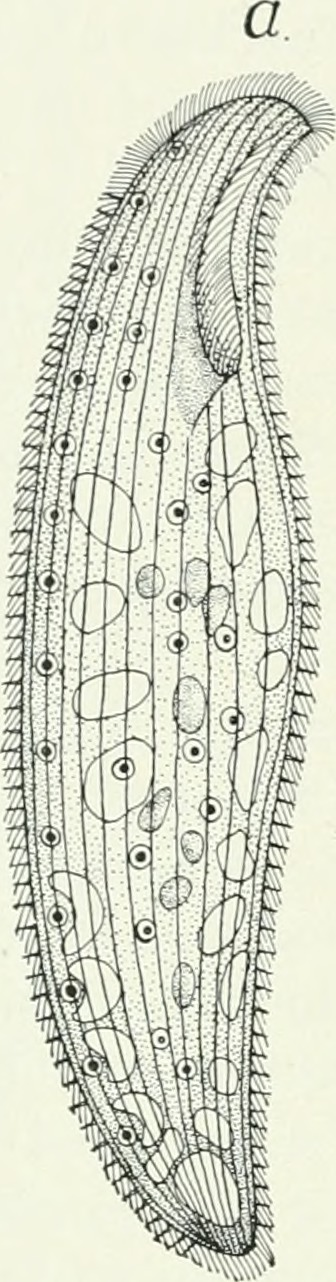
- Illustration of Loxodes rostrum

Scientific classification
- Domain: Eukaryota
- Clade: Sar
- Clade: Alveolata
- Phylum: Ciliophora
- Subphylum: Postciliodesmatophora
- Class: Karyorelictea; Corliss, 1974

Orders
- Loxodida; Protoheterotrichida; Protostomatida; Family incertae sedis: Wilbertomorphidae

= Karyorelictea =

Class of protists belonging to the ciliates phylum

Karyorelictea is a class of ciliates in the subphylum Postciliodesmatophora. Most species are members of the microbenthos community, that is, microscopic organisms found in the marine interstitial habitat, though one genus, Loxodes, is found in freshwater.

The majority of karyorelict taxa have not been cultivated in the laboratory, although clonal lines of Loxodes have been developed.

== Systematics ==
According to Lynn (2008), the Karyorelictea class is divided into three orders:

- Loxodida, containing the families Cryptopharyngidae and Loxodidae;
- Protoheterotrichida, containing the families Aveliidae and Geleiidae;
- Protostomatida, containing the families Kentrophoridae and Trachelocercidae.

These three orders were defined morphologically, and have been confirmed with molecular phylogenetics.

An additional family, Wilbertomorphidae, is of uncertain affiliation and has not been assigned to an order.

== Nuclear dimorphism ==
All ciliates, including karyorelicteans, possess two different kinds of nucleus, which separate the functions of gene expression and sexual recombination. The macronuclei, or somatic nuclei, are the site of transcription, while the smaller micronuclei, or germline nuclei, are only active during sexual reproduction, where they first undergo meiosis to form gametic nuclei, which are exchanged when two mating cells conjugate. Two gametic nuclei fuse to form a zygotic nucleus, which divides by mitosis into two daughter nuclei, one of which develops into a new micronucleus and the other into a macronucleus; the old macronucleus typically disintegrates (see main article).

In most ciliates, a macronucleus can divide during asexual reproduction to form new daughter macronuclei, through a process called amitosis. However, in karyorelicteans, the macronuclei are unable to divide. Instead, they must be produced by division and differentiation of a micronucleus every time, even during asexual reproduction.

Because of their non-dividing somatic macronuclei, the karyorelicteans were thought to represent an intermediate evolutionary stage between the hypothetical ancestor of ciliates that did not have nuclear dualism, and the other more "advanced" ciliates which had both nuclear dualism and macronuclei that could divide by amitosis. The name of the group therefore makes reference to their supposedly "primitive" nuclei. This theory has since been superseded, as molecular phylogenies have shown that the karyorelicteans are not the most "primitive" or basally-branching group of ciliates.

== Ecology ==
Almost all karyorelictean species, except Loxodes, have been described from the marine interstitial habitat, where they live in the pore-water spaces between sediment grains. Animals from such habitats are known as meiofauna, and karyorelicteans have many morphological similarities to meiofaunal animals despite being protists: most karyorelicteans are relatively large (1 mm or more in length), have a worm-like (vermiform) body shape with an elongated tail, and exhibit thigmotactic behavior. Most karyorelicteans feed on bacteria or algae, and prefer microaerobic conditions. However, one genus, Kentrophoros, lacks an oral apparatus and feeds instead on symbiotic sulfur-oxidizing bacteria that are attached to one side of the cell.

== Etymology ==
The class name Karyorelictea derives from the ancient greek κάρυον (káruon), meaning "hard-shelled seed, or nucleus", and from the Latin relictus, meaning 'abandoned'.

== Alternative genetic code ==
An alternative genetic code is used by the nuclear genome of some karyorelictid ciliates (e.g. Parduczia sp.). This code corresponds to translation table 27 and involves the reassignment of three codons:

- UAA into Gln (Q) ;
- UAG into Gln (Q) ;
- UGA into Trp (W) or Termination (*).
