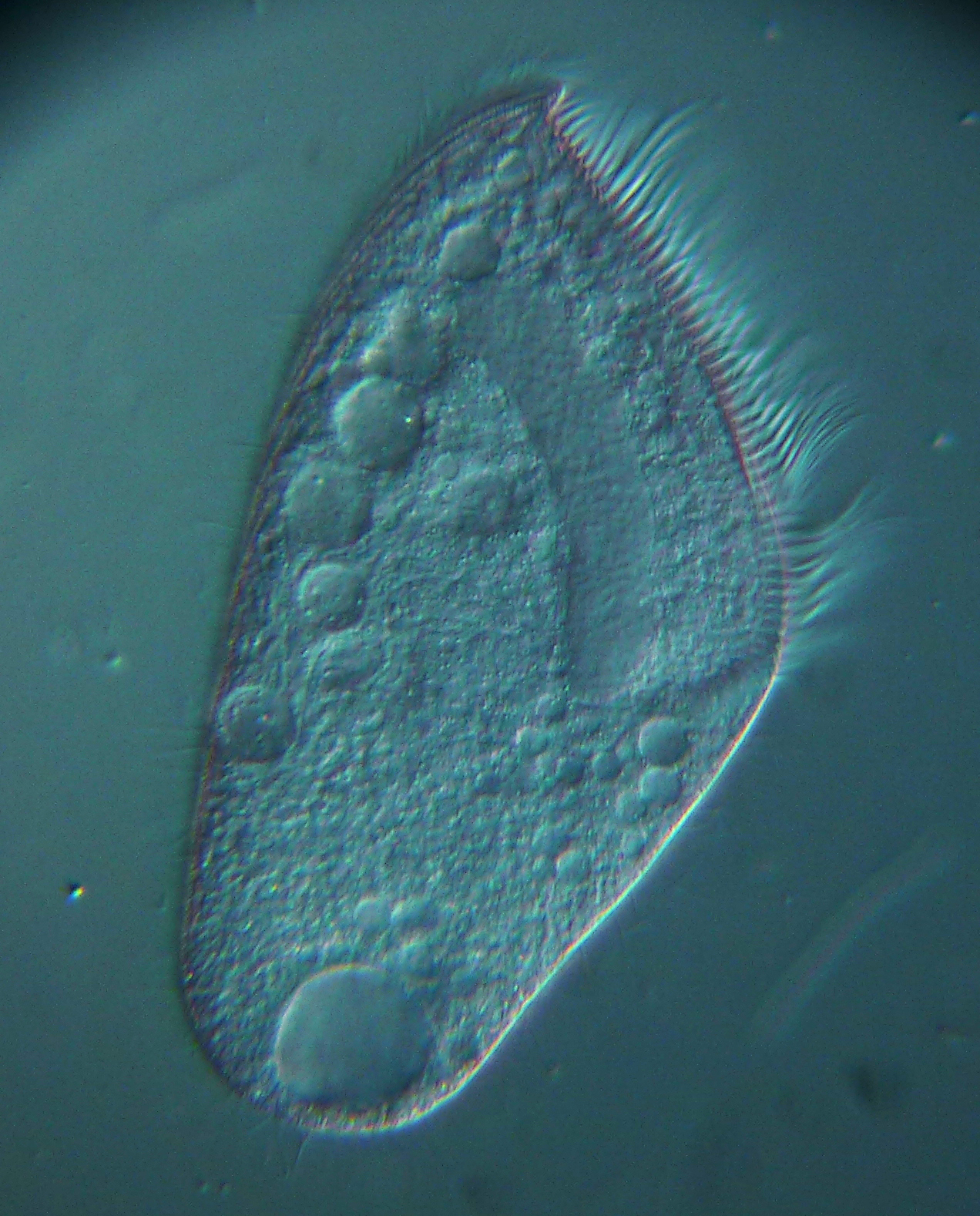
- Blepharisma hyalinum

Scientific classification
- Domain: Eukaryota
- Clade: Sar
- Clade: Alveolata
- Phylum: Ciliophora
- Subphylum: Postciliodesmatophora; Gerassimova & Seravin, 1976

Classes
- Heterotrichea; Karyorelictea

Synonyms
- Polyhymenophora

= Postciliodesmatophora =

Subphylum of ciliate protists

Postciliodesmatophora is a subphylum of ciliates, comprising the classes Heterotrichea and Karyorelictea.

Members of this subphylum are characterized by postciliodesmata (singular: postciliodesma), stacks of postciliary microtubular ribbons associated with the somatic kinetosomes.
