= Chaetosomatida =

Group of roundworms

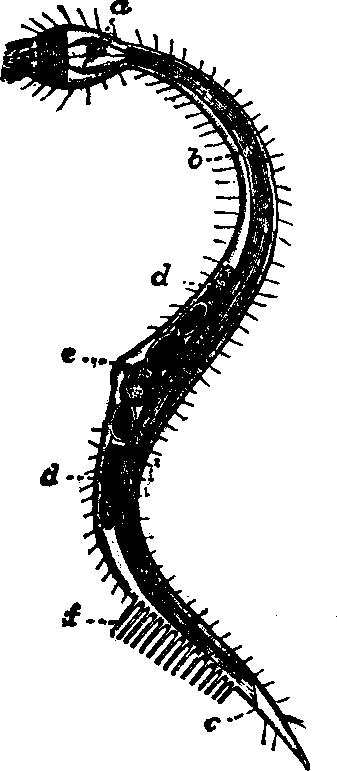
Mature female of Chaetosoma chalaredii. a, Oesophagus; b, intestine; c, anus; d, ovary; e, generative pore; f, ventral bristles.

Chaetosomatida is a small group of minute, free-living, aquatic organisms which are usually placed as an annex to the Nematoda.

== Historical description ==
In 1878 Élie Metchnikoff, who provided the original description of these forms, called them "creeping Nematoda". They are usually found amongst seaweed in temperate seas, but they are probably widely distributed; some are fresh-water. The genus Chaetosoma, with the two species Ch. claparedii and Ch. ophicephalum and the genus Tristicochaeta, have swollen heads. The third genus Rhabdogaster has no such distinct head, though the body may be swollen anteriorly. The mouth is terminal and anterior and surrounded by a ring of spicules or a half-ring of hooks. Scattered hairs cover the body. Just in front of the anus there is in Chaetosorna a double, and in Tristicochaeta a triple row of about fifteen stout cylindrical projections upon which the animals creep. The females are a little larger than the males; in Ch. claparedii the former attain a length of 1.5 mm, the latter of 1.12 mm. The mouth opens into an oesophagus which passes into an intestine; this opens by a ventral anus situated a little in front of the posterior end. The testis is single, and its duct opens with the anus, and is provided with a couple of spicules. The ovary is double, and the oviducts open by a median ventral pore about the middle of the body; in this region there is a second swelling both in Chaetosoma and in Rhabdogaster. The last-named form is in the female 0.36 mm in length. In it the hairs are confined to the dorsal middle line and the creeping setae are hooked, of a finer structure than in Chaetosoma, and situated so far forward that the vagina opens amongst them. Ch. ophicephalum has been found in the English Channel.

== Contemporary description ==
Contemporary study has revised understanding of the taxonomy, and these species are now considered members of the Nematodes. As of 2008, according to ITIS, the genus Tristicochaeta is regarded as a junior synonym of the genus Drepanonema, in which it is joined by some of the species of the above mentioned genus Chaetosoma, with one species of Chaetosoma now located in the genus Prochaetosoma. Both of the above mentioned genera are part of the family Draconematidae, but the genus Rhabdogaster had two species now located in different genera of the family Epsilonematidae. Both Draconematidae and Epsilonematidae are part of the order Desmodorida.
