= North-Western State Medical University =

Public university in St. Petersburg, Russia

Coordinates: 59.9839°N 30.4305°E

North-Western State Medical University named after I.I. Mechnikov
- Северо-Западный государственный медицинский университет им. И.И. Мечникова
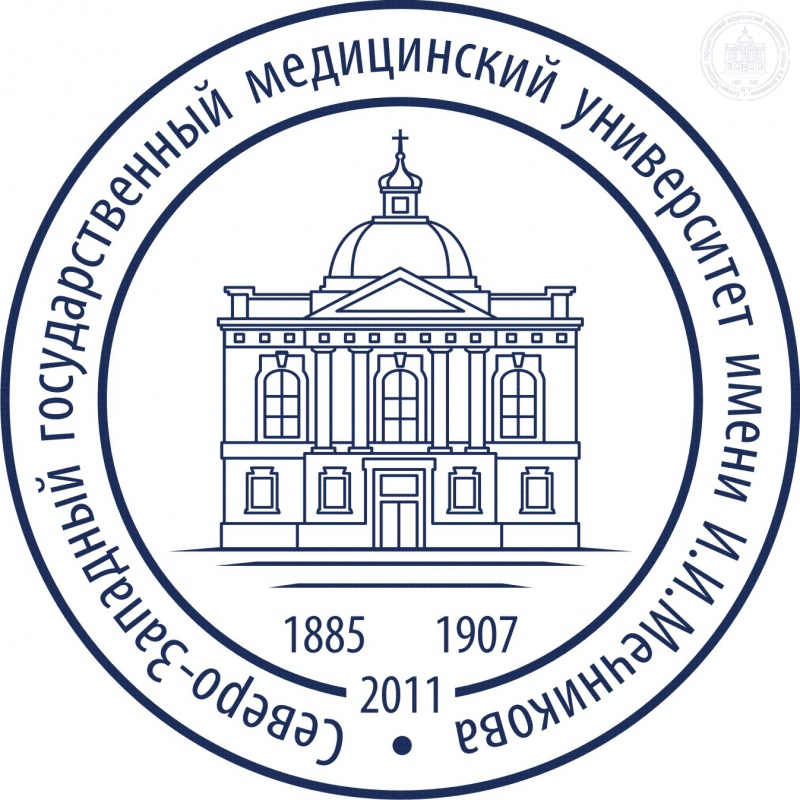
- Logo of the North-Western State Medical University named after I.I. Mechnikov
- Former name: Saint Petersburg State Medical Academy
- Type: Public
- Established: 2011
- Affiliations: non-denominational
- Rector: Lila Aleksandr Mikhailovich (Лила Александр Михайлович)
- Administrative staff: 750 (112 DSc, 433 PhD, 82 Prof, and 167 AProf)
- Students: 5000
- Location: 191015, Russian Federation, Saint-Petersburg, Kirochnaya street, 41 195067, Russia, St. Petersburg, Piskarevskij prospect, 47, (Russia) Saint Petersburg, Northwestern Federal District, Russian Federation
- Campus: Urban (40 000 м²)
- Website: www.mechnik.spb.ru

The North-Western State Medical University named after I. I. Mechnikov (NWSMU), formerly St. Petersburg I. I. Mechnikov State Medical Academy, is a public medical university located in St. Petersburg, Russian Federation. The NWSMU is one of the oldest and largest Russian Higher Medical Schools. It is often called the Second Medical College in St. Petersburg because of its renaming in 1920, relative to Saint Petersburg State Medical University, which is called the First Medical College.

More than 35,000 physicians graduated from the university. Since beginning the international program in 1947 there have been more than 3500 international graduates from more than 50 countries. Currently there is a total student population of over 5,000. The university was established in 2011 following a merger of SPSMA with the St. Petersburg Medical Academy for Postgraduate Studies.

== History ==
The NWSMU was established in 1907 under the direction of academician Vladimir Bekhterev and developed by the Russian Government through the Ministry of Health on the basis of the laws of Russian Federation.

=== Name changes ===
- 1907–1920 - Medical Faculty of Psycho Neurological Institute
- 1920–1936 - Second Leningrad Medical Institute
- 1936–1946 - The Institute united with a city hospital and named after Nobel Laureate Ilya Ilyich Mechnikov
- 1946–1994 - Leningrad Medical Institute of Sanitary and Hygiene by the order of the Board of Ministers of the USSR (N 14077 from 22.12.1946)
- 1994–1995 - St. Petersburg State Medical Academy (WHO Directory, 7 ed., page 329)
- 1995–2011 - The SPSMA was named after the great Russian scientist I. I. Mechnikov (order N 1307-p, dated 22.12.1995)
- 2011–Present - The St. Petersburg I. I. Mechnikov State Medical Academy was renamed to North-Western State Medical University named after I.I. Mechnikov, specializing in the provision of health care to the Northwestern Federal District of the Russian Federation

== Notable graduates ==
- Pyotr Anokhin (1926) (Cybernetics, Theory of functional systems)
- Sergey Elizarovskiy (1934) (World War II surgeon, Stomatology)
- Aleksandr Panov (1928)
- Ivan Gevorkian (1930) Surgeon and scientist.
- Sergey Mardashyov (1930)
- Anatoliy Portnov (1914–2006), psychiatrist (ru)
- Ekaterina Mikhailova-Demina (1950) (Soviet war heroine, doctor)

== See also ==
- Saint Petersburg State Medical University
