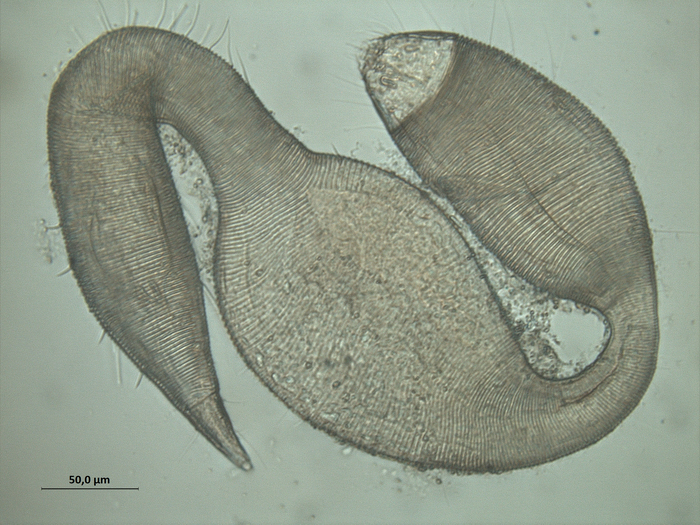
- Dracograllus eira

Scientific classification
- Kingdom: Animalia
- Phylum: Nematoda
- Class: Chromadorea
- Order: Desmodorida
- Family: Draconematidae
- Subfamily: Draconematinae
- Genus: Dracograllus; Allen & Noffsinger, 1978

Type species
- Dracograllus cobbi Allen & Noffsinger, 1978

Species
- see text

= Dracograllus =

Genus of marine worms

== Dracograllus ==
Dracograllus is the largest genus in the family of free-living walking nematodes, Draconematidae, including 26 recognized species.

== Characteristics ==
Dracograllus can be separated into two separate groups, which can be identified by the amount of CAT (Cephalic Adhesion Tubes) on the head capsule. These are used by the nematodes for locomotion. Group 1 has between 12 and 18 CAT, which includes five species, while the second group has 6 to 9 CAT, containing the remaining 26 species.

Additionally, the second group can be subdivided into three subgroups based off the shape of the male's amphidial fovea (which contains the nematodes' Amphid). Fourteen species have long loop shaped amphidial fovea, eleven species have small loop shaped amphidial fovea, and one species lacks amphidial fovea entirely. However, 5 of these grouped species are considered nomen nudum.

Members of Draconematidae are known as 'walking nematodes' because they use their CAT to 'walk' along their sandy habitats. Their bodies form a unique 'S' shape, which has also led to another nickname, 'dragon nematodes'.

All Dracograllus species feature swollen anterior body regions, 18-26% of total body length.

== Range ==
Dracograllus are found globally, most commonly in shallow and intertidal habitats, with the exception of Dracograllus Miguelitus, which lives near deep-sea hydrothermal vents. Other deep-sea species have been reported, but not formally identified.

== Species ==
A total of 26 species are recognized:

- D. antillensis Decraemer & Gourbault, 1986
- D. chitwoodi Allen & Noffsinger, 1978
- D. cobbi Allen & Noffsinger, 1978
- D. cornutus Decraemer, 1988
- D. demani Allen & Noffsinger, 1978
- D. eira (Inglis, 1968)
- D. falcatum (Irwin-Smith, 1918) Allen & Noffsinger, 1978
- D. filipjevi Allen & Noffsinger, 1978
- D. gerlachi Allen & Noffsinger, 1978
- D. gilbertae Verschelde & Vincx, 1993
- D. grootaerti Decraemer, 1988
- D. kreisi Allen & Noffsinger, 1978
- D. laingensis Decraemer, 1988
- D. mawsoni Allen & Noffsinger, 1978
- D. miguelitus Johnson da Silva, Zeppilli, Foulon, Dessandier, Matabos & Sarrazin, 2025
- D. minutus Decraemer, 1988
- D. ngakei Leduc & Zhao, 2016
- D. papuensis Decraemer, 1988
- D. pusilus Decraemer, 1988
- D. solidus (Gerlach, 1952)
- D. spinosus Decraemer, 1988
- D. stekhoveni Allen & Noffsinger, 1978
- D. timmi Allen & Noffsinger, 1978
- D. trispinosum Allen & Noffsinger, 1978
- D. trukensis Min, Kim, Decraemer & Rho, 2016
- D. wieseri Allen & Noffsinger, 1978
