= Sabatieria furcillata =

Scientific classification
- Domain: Eukaryota
- Kingdom: Animalia
- Phylum: Nematoda
- Class: Chromadorea
- Order: Araeolaimida
- Family: Comesomatidae
- Genus: Sabatieria
- Species: S. furcillata

Binomial name
- Sabatieria furcillata Wieser 1954

Species of nematode

Sabatieria furcillata is a nematode in the family Comesomatidae ranking. It was described in 1954 by the Austrian zoologist Wolfgang Wieser.
