= Phagocytosis =

Cell membrane engulfing a large particle

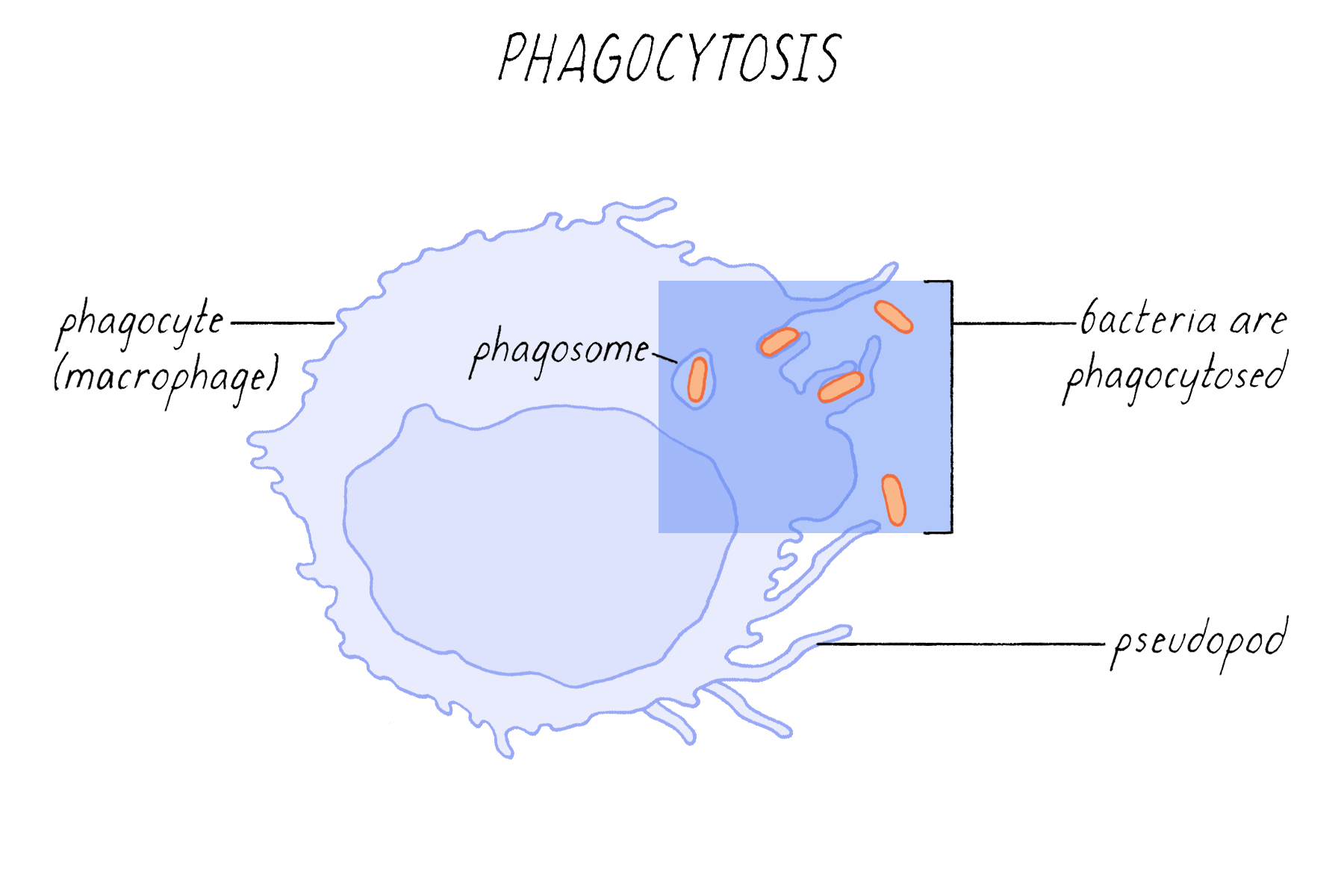
Overview of phagocytosis

Phagocytosis versus exocytosis

Phagocytosis (from Ancient Greek φαγεῖν (phagein) 'to eat' and κύτος (kytos) 'cell') is the process by which a cell uses its plasma membrane to engulf a large particle (≥ 0.5 μm), giving rise to an internal compartment called the phagosome. It is one type of endocytosis. A cell that performs phagocytosis is called a phagocyte.

The engulfing of a pathogen by a phagocyte

In a multicellular organism's immune system, phagocytosis is a major mechanism used to remove pathogens and cell debris. The ingested material is then digested in the phagosome. Bacteria, dead tissue cells, and small mineral particles are all examples of objects that may be phagocytized. Some protozoa use phagocytosis as means to obtain nutrients. The two main cells that do this are the Macrophages and the Neutrophils of the immune system.

Where phagocytosis is used as a means of feeding and provides the organism part or all of its nourishment, it is called phagotrophy and is distinguished from osmotrophy, which is nutrition taking place by absorption.

== History ==
The history of phagocytosis represents the scientific establishment of immunology as the process is the first immune response mechanism discovered and understood as such. The earliest definitive account of cell eating was given by Swiss scientist Albert von Kölliker in 1849. In his report in Zeitschrift für Wissenschaftliche Zoologie, Kölliker described the feeding process of an amoeba-like alga, Actinophyrys sol (a heliozoan) mentioning details of how the protist engulfed and swallowed (the process now called endocytosis) a small organism, that he named infusoria (a generic name for microbes at the time).

The first demonstration of phagocytosis as a property of leucocytes, the immune cells, was from the German zoologist Ernst Haeckel. Haeckel discovered that blood cells of sea slug, Tethys, could ingest indigo particles. It was the first direct evidence of phagocytosis by immune cells. Haeckel reported his experiment in a 1862 monograph Die Radiolarien (Rhizopoda Radiaria): Eine Monographie.

Phagocytosis was noted by Canadian physician William Osler (1876), and later studied and named by Élie Metchnikoff (1880, 1883).

== In immune system ==
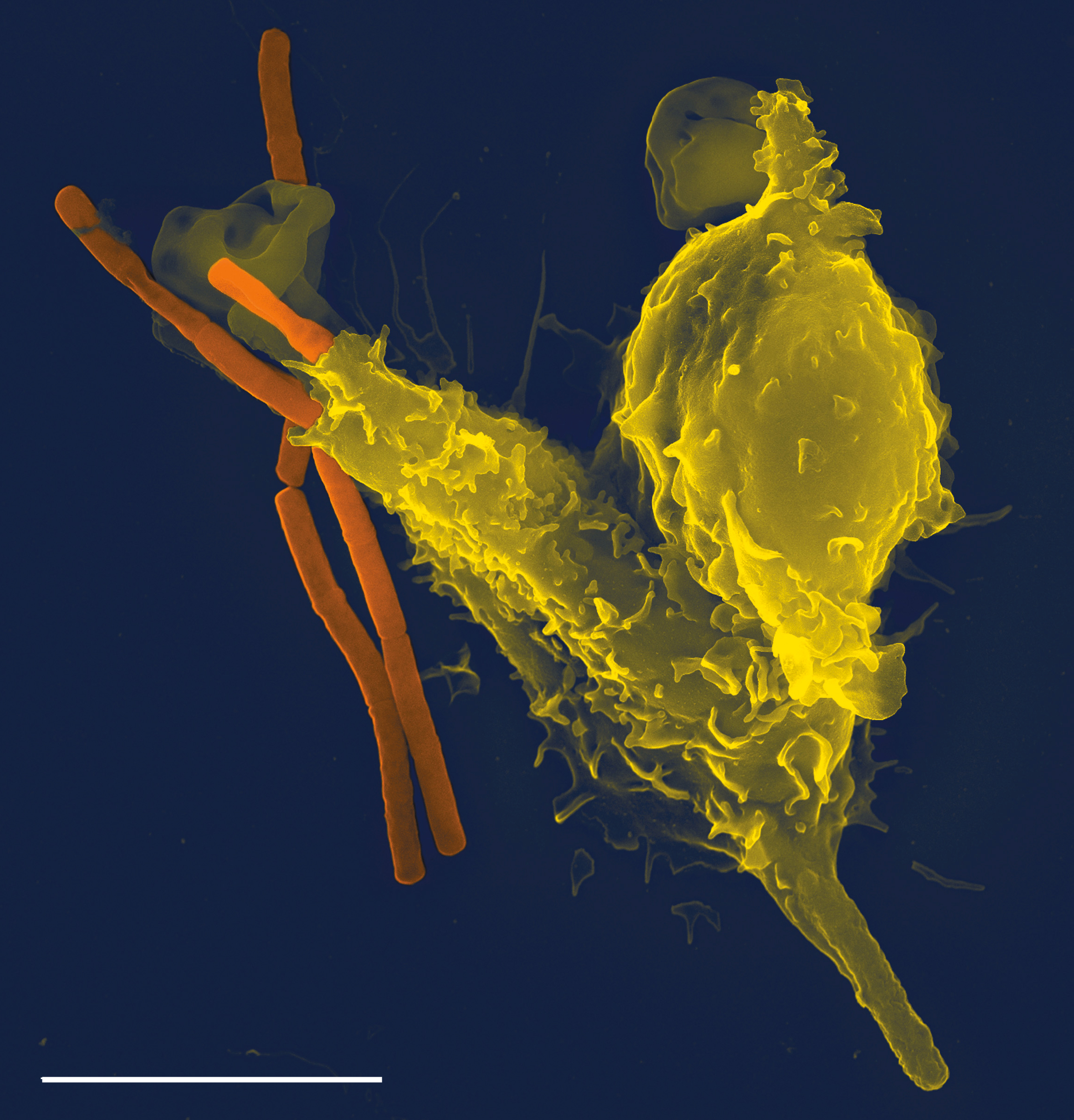
Scanning electron micrograph of a phagocyte (yellow, right) phagocytosing anthrax bacilli (orange, left)

Phagocytosis is one main mechanisms of the innate immune defense. It is one of the first processes responding to infection, and is also one of the initiating branches of an adaptive immune response. Although most cells are capable of phagocytosis, some cell types perform it as part of their main function. These are called 'professional phagocytes.' Phagocytosis is old in evolutionary terms, being present even in invertebrates.

=== Professional phagocytic cells ===
Light microscopic video sequence of a neutrophil from human blood phagocytosing a bacterium

Neutrophils, macrophages, monocytes, dendritic cells, osteoclasts and eosinophils can be classified as professional phagocytes. The first three have the greatest role in immune response to most infections.

The role of neutrophils is patrolling the bloodstream and rapid migration to the tissues in large numbers only in case of infection. There they have direct microbicidal effect by phagocytosis. After ingestion, neutrophils are efficient in intracellular killing of pathogens. Neutrophils phagocytose mainly via the Fcγ receptors and complement receptors 1 and 3. The microbicidal effect of neutrophils is due to a large repertoire of molecules present in pre-formed granules. Enzymes and other molecules prepared in these granules are proteases, such as collagenase, gelatinase or serine proteases, myeloperoxidase, lactoferrin and antibiotic proteins. Degranulation of these into the phagosome, accompanied by high reactive oxygen species production (oxidative burst) is highly microbicidal.

Monocytes, and the macrophages that mature from them, leave blood circulation to migrate through tissues. There they are resident cells and form a resting barrier. Macrophages initiate phagocytosis by mannose receptors, scavenger receptors, Fcγ receptors and complement receptors 1, 3 and 4. Macrophages are long-lived and can continue phagocytosis by forming new lysosomes.

Dendritic cells also reside in tissues and ingest pathogens by phagocytosis. Their role is not killing or clearance of microbes, but rather breaking them down for antigen presentation to the cells of the adaptive immune system.

=== Initiating receptors ===
Receptors for phagocytosis can be divided into two categories by recognised molecules. The first, opsonic receptors, are dependent on opsonins. Among these are receptors that recognise the Fc part of bound IgG antibodies, deposited complement or receptors, that recognise other opsonins of cell or plasma origin. Non-opsonic receptors include lectin-type receptors, Dectin receptor, or scavenger receptors. Some phagocytic pathways require a second signal from pattern recognition receptors (PRRs) activated by attachment to pathogen-associated molecular patterns (PAMPS), which leads to NF-κB activation.

==== Fcγ receptors ====
Fcγ receptors recognise IgG coated targets. The main recognised part is the Fc fragment. The molecule of the receptor contain an intracellular ITAM domain or associates with an ITAM-containing adaptor molecule. ITAM domains transduce the signal from the surface of the phagocyte to the nucleus. For example, activating receptors of human macrophages are FcγRI, FcγRIIA, and FcγRIII. Fcγ receptor mediated phagocytosis includes formation of protrusions of the cell called a 'phagocytic cup' and activates an oxidative burst in neutrophils.

==== Complement receptors ====
These receptors recognise targets coated in C3b, C4b and C3bi from plasma complement. The extracellular domain of the receptors contains a lectin-like complement-binding domain. Recognition by complement receptors is not enough to cause internalisation without additional signals. In macrophages, the CR1, CR3 and CR4 are responsible for recognition of targets. Complement coated targets are internalised by 'sinking' into the phagocyte membrane, without any protrusions.

==== Mannose receptors ====
Mannose and other pathogen-associated sugars, such as fucose, are recognised by the mannose receptor. Eight lectin-like domains form the extracellular part of the receptor. The ingestion mediated by the mannose receptor is distinct in molecular mechanisms from Fcγ receptor or complement receptor mediated phagocytosis.

=== Phagosome ===
Engulfment of material is facilitated by the actin-myosin contractile system. The phagosome is the organelle formed by phagocytosis of material. It then moves toward the centrosome of the phagocyte and is fused with lysosomes, forming a phagolysosome and leading to degradation. Progressively, the phagolysosome is acidified, activating degradative enzymes.

Degradation can be oxygen-dependent or oxygen-independent.

- Oxygen-dependent degradation depends on NADPH and the production of reactive oxygen species. Hydrogen peroxide and myeloperoxidase activate a halogenating system, which leads to the creation of hypochlorite and the destruction of bacteria.
- Oxygen-independent degradation depends on the release of granules, containing enzymes such as lysozymes, Bactericidal permeability-increasing protein, Major basic protein and cationic proteins such as defensins. Other antimicrobial peptides are present in these granules, including lactoferrin, which sequesters iron to provide unfavourable growth conditions for bacteria. Other enzymes like hyaluronidase, lipase, collagenase, elastase, ribonuclease, deoxyribonuclease also play an important role in preventing the spread of infection and degradation of essential microbial biomolecules leading to cell death.

Leukocytes generate hydrogen cyanide during phagocytosis, and can kill bacteria, fungi, and other pathogens by generating several other toxic chemicals.

Some bacteria, for example Treponema pallidum, Escherichia coli and Staphylococcus aureus, are able to avoid phagocytosis by several mechanisms.

== In apoptosis ==
Following apoptosis, the dying cells need to be taken up into the surrounding tissues by macrophages in a process called efferocytosis. One of the features of an apoptotic cell is the presentation of a variety of intracellular molecules on the cell surface, such as calreticulin, phosphatidylserine (from the inner layer of the plasma membrane), annexin A1, oxidised LDL and altered glycans. These molecules are recognised by receptors on the cell surface of the macrophage such as the phosphatidylserine receptor or by soluble (free-floating) receptors such as thrombospondin 1, GAS6, and MFGE8, which themselves then bind to other receptors on the macrophage such as CD36 and alpha-v beta-3 integrin. Defects in apoptotic cell clearance is usually associated with impaired phagocytosis of macrophages. Accumulation of apoptotic cell remnants often causes autoimmune disorders; thus pharmacological potentiation of phagocytosis has a medical potential in treatment of certain forms of autoimmune disorders.

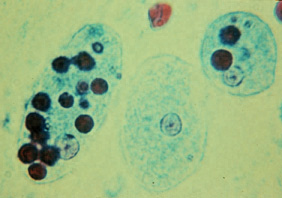
Trophozoites of Entamoeba histolytica with ingested erythrocytes

== In protists ==
Phagocytosis is used by many protists as a means of feeding, thus constituting phagotrophy.

- In some, such as amoeba, phagocytosis takes place by surrounding the target object with pseudopods, as in animal phagocytes. In humans, the amoebozoan Entamoeba histolytica can phagocytose red blood cells.
- Ciliates also engage in phagocytosis. In ciliates there is a specialized groove or chamber in the cell where phagocytosis takes place, called the cytostome or mouth.

As in phagocytic immune cells, the resulting phagosome may be merged with lysosomes (food vacuoles) containing digestive enzymes, forming a phagolysosome. The food particles will then be digested, and the released nutrients are diffused or transported into the cytosol for use in other metabolic processes.

Mixotrophy can involve phagotrophic nutrition and phototrophic nutrition.

== See also ==
- Active transport
- Antigen presentation
- Antigen-presenting cell
- Emperipolesis
- Endosymbionts in protists
- Paracytophagy
- Phagoptosis
- Pinocytosis
- Residual body
- Cell wall
