= Isaak Krasilschik =

Russian entomologist

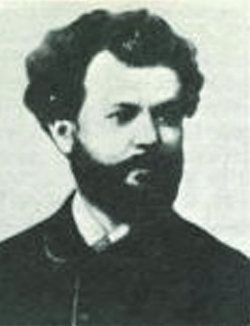

Isaak Matveevich Krasilschik (14 April 1857 – 16 November 1920) was a Bessarabian Jewish algologist and agricultural entomologist. He established a lab to produce green muscardine for biological control of insect pests.

== Life and work ==
Krasilschik, a Bessarabian Jew, was born in Chișinău and was educated at the Real Lyceum of Chișinău. He graduated in natural sciences from the University of Novorossiia in Odessa (currently University of Odessa) in 1879. In 1882 he received a doctorate with a thesis on the development in Polytoma. He then began to work on problems of plant protection and applied entomology thanks to his doctoral advisor Élie Metchnikoff's influence and began to study pests, particularly phylloxera and locusts. He became a member of the Odesa phylloxera committee in 1883 under A.I. Poghibko along with E.L. Rekalo. He also collaborated with Count Bobrinski and experimented on control of the sugarbeet weevil using muscardine. He established a lab to produce the spores of muscardine. He was a founding member of the Bessarabian natural history society in 1904.
