= Choniolaimidae =

Scientific classification
- Kingdom: Animalia
- Phylum: Nematoda
- Class: Chromadorea
- Order: Desmodorida
- Family: Choniolaimidae; Stekhoven & Adam, 1931

Family of nematodes

Choniolaimidae is a family of nematodes belonging to the order Desmodorida.

Genera:

- Choniolaimus Ditlevsen, 1918
- Cobbionema Filipjev, 1922
- Gammanema Cobb, 1920
- Halichoanolaimus de Man, 1886
- Latronema Wieser, 1954
- Nunema N.Cobb, 1933
- Pseudonchus Cobb, 1920
