= Microlaimidae =

Scientific classification
- Kingdom: Animalia
- Phylum: Nematoda
- Class: Chromadorea
- Order: Desmodorida
- Family: Microlaimidae

Family of nematodes

Microlaimidae is a family of nematodes belonging to the order Desmodorida.

== Genera ==
Genera:

- Acanthomicrolaimus Stewart & Nicholas, 1987
- Aponema Jensen, 1978
- Bathynox Bussau & Vopel, 1999
