= Yekaterina Mikhailova-Demina =

Russian combat medic (1925–2019)

Ekaterina Mikhailova-Demina
- Екатерина Илларионовна Михайлова-Дёмина
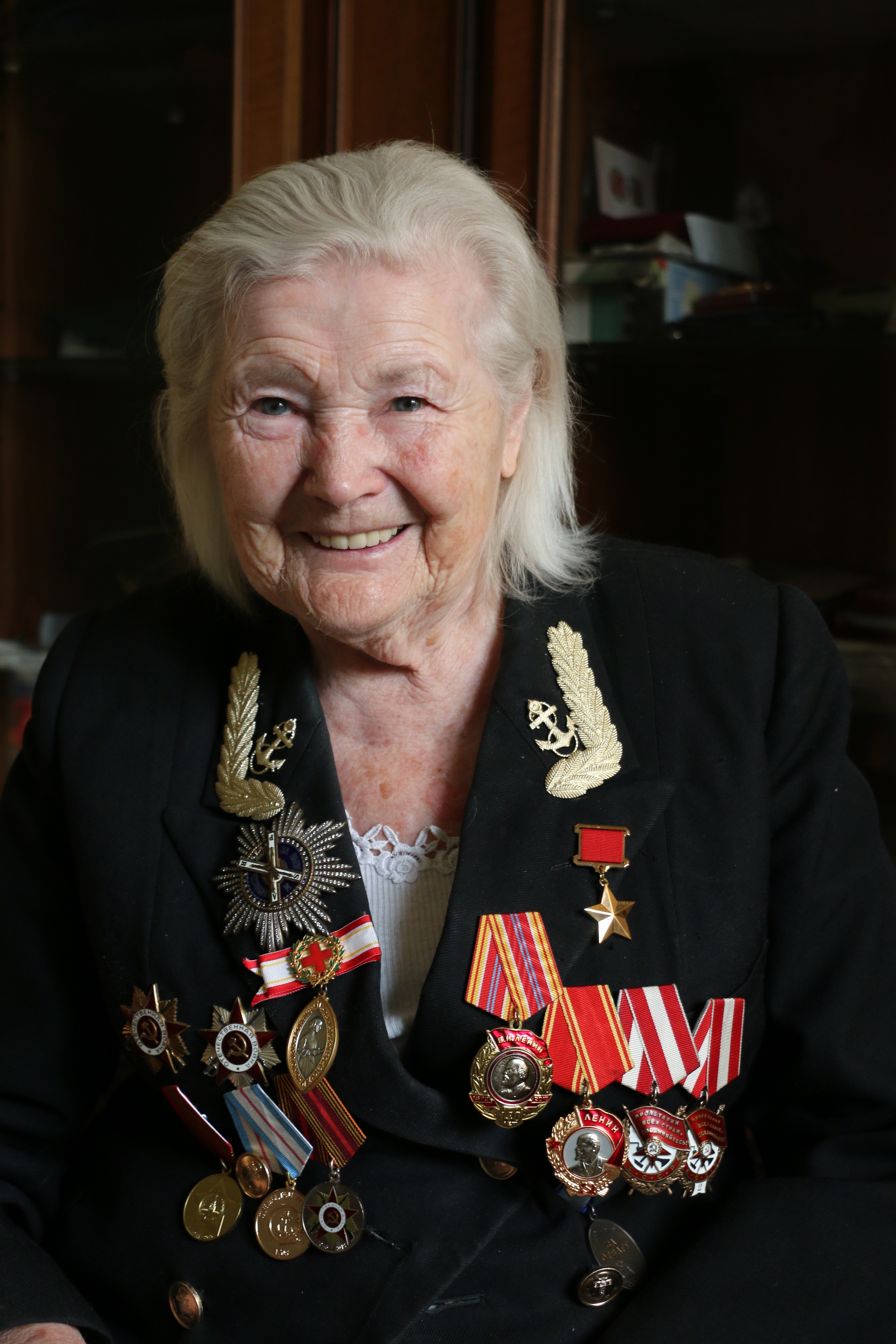
- Mikhailova-Demina in 2016
- Born: 22 December 1925; Leningrad, Soviet Union
- Died: 24 June 2019 (aged 93); Moscow, Russia
- Military career
- Allegiance: Soviet Union
- Branch: Marines
- Service years: 1941–1945
- Rank: Chief Petty Officer
- Unit: 369th Independent Naval Infantry Battalion
- Conflicts: World War II
- Awards: Hero of the Soviet Union

Ekaterina Illarionovna Mikhailova-Demina (Russian: Екатерина Илларионовна Михайлова-Дёмина; 22 December 1925 – 24 June 2019) was a combat medic of the Soviet Marines during World War II. During the war, she carried hundreds of wounded men to safety, and was seriously wounded herself three times. She was denied higher awards at the end of the war due to the Soviet Union's unequal treatment of women soldiers. In May 1990, President Mikhail Gorbachev awarded her the title of Hero of the Soviet Union.

== Wartime career ==
Mikhailova-Demina was born in Leningrad. Her parents died when she was young and she grew up in a Leningrad orphanage.

She was 15 when the Great Patriotic War started in June 1941. The train she was travelling in to Brest was bombed. She volunteered for military service in Smolensk by claiming to be 17. Her application was rejected. Instead, she was accepted by a military hospital.

The hospital was bombed soon after and the patients were evacuated. Mikhailova-Demina remained and became a Red Army field medic during a period of desperate shortage of medical personnel. She suffered a serious leg injury in fighting near Gzhatsk and was sent to the Urals to recuperate. She returned to duty aboard the Soviet Navy hospital ship Red Moscow, transporting wounded soldiers from Stalingrad to Krasnovodsk across the Caspian Sea. She was promoted to chief petty officer and commended for exemplary service.

Boredom caused her to volunteer for front-line service with the marines of the Azov Flotilla; the request was only accepted after she appealed to the government in Moscow. She joined the 369th Independent Naval Infantry Battalion in February 1943; she first saw action on the Taman Peninsula on the Azov Sea, and later on the Black Sea and the Dniester. The unit transferred to the Danube Flotilla, seeing action in Romania, Bulgaria, Hungary, Yugoslavia and Austria; she ended the war in Vienna.

She was not welcomed at first by the men in her unit. However, she was soon accepted after she proved that she could handle herself well in the front line. As well as scouting enemy territory alongside her male colleagues, her work involved treating the wounded and evacuating them to safety. She won her first medal for valour for participating in the recapture of Temryuk on the Taman Peninsula and was awarded the first of two Orders of the Patriotic War for taking part in the Battle of Kerch.

In August 1944, Mikhailova-Demina participated in a commando-style operation to recapture the city of Bilhorod-Dnistrovskyi in Ukraine. Her unit crossed the Dniester estuary in rubber boats and climbed an enemy-held ridge. Mikhailova-Demina was in the first group to climb the ridge and joined in the charge to expel the enemy from the ridge. She single-handedly assaulted a fortified German position, blew up their bunker, killed 20 Nazis, taking 14 prisoners, and treated 17 wounded sailors and helped them get to safety. She earned an Order of the Red Banner for her role in the assault.

Four months later, in December 1944, her unit had advanced to Yugoslavia. During an attack on the Ilok fortress in Croatia, she was one of 50 marines who carried out a diversionary attack from a small island in the Danube below the fortress. The unit had to use trees as firing positions as the island was flooded. In the firefight that followed, Mikhailova-Demina was shot through the hand. Only 13 of her unit survived the intense gun battle and all were wounded. Some of the casualties fell out of their trees and into the freezing water but were saved by Mikhailova-Demina, who jumped in and used belts and rifle slings to tie the wounded men to the trees. Seven men were saved by her. The battle left her with double pneumonia in addition to the wound to her hand and required her to be hospitalized. Despite this, she left the hospital early without authorization and returned to her unit. She was awarded a second Order of the Red Banner for her heroism.

== Post-war career and recognition ==
Mikhailova-Demina was demobilised in November 1945 but continued to work in the medical profession after the war, including stints with the Soviet Red Cross and Red Crescent Society. She was awarded the Florence Nightingale Medal by the International Committee of the Red Cross for her work during the war. In 1950, she graduated from the Second Leningrad Medical Institute and worked as a doctor for 36 years, retiring in 1985.

She was nominated three times for the Hero of the Soviet Union, the country's highest distinction, but was turned down on each occasion. She finally received the medal along with the Order of Lenin and Gold Star by a decree issued by President Gorbachev on 5 May 1990 to mark the 45th anniversary of the end of the war. Mikhailova-Demina was one of the last honored before the fall of the Soviet Union in 1991.

After the death of Yevdokiya Pasko in January 2017, Demina remained the last living female Hero of the Soviet Union that was a veteran of the Second World War, with the other two being cosmonauts Valentina Tereshkova and Svetlana Savitskaya.

Mikhailova-Demina died in June 2019 at the age of 93 and was buried in the Troyekurovskoye Cemetery (plot 26).

== Awards and honors ==
- Florence Nightingale Medal (15 May 1979)
- Hero of the Soviet Union (5 May 1990)
- Order of Lenin (5 May 1990)
- Two Orders of the Red Banner (27 September 1944 and 8 March 1945)
- Order of the Patriotic War 1st class and 2nd class (1st class - 11 March 1985; 2nd class - 15 February 1944)
- Medal "For Courage" (31 October 1943)
- Medal "For the Capture of Vienna"
- Medal "For the Capture of Königsberg"
- Medal "For the Capture of Budapest"
- various jubilee medals

== See also ==
- List of female Heroes of the Soviet Union
