= Monoposthiidae =

Scientific classification
- Kingdom: Animalia
- Phylum: Nematoda
- Class: Chromadorea
- Order: Desmodorida
- Family: Monoposthiidae

Family of nematodes

Monoposthiidae is a family of nematodes belonging to the order Desmodorida.

Genera:

- Monoposthia de Man, 1889
- Monoposthioides Hopper, 1963
- Nudora Cobb, 1920
- Rhinema Cobb, 1920
