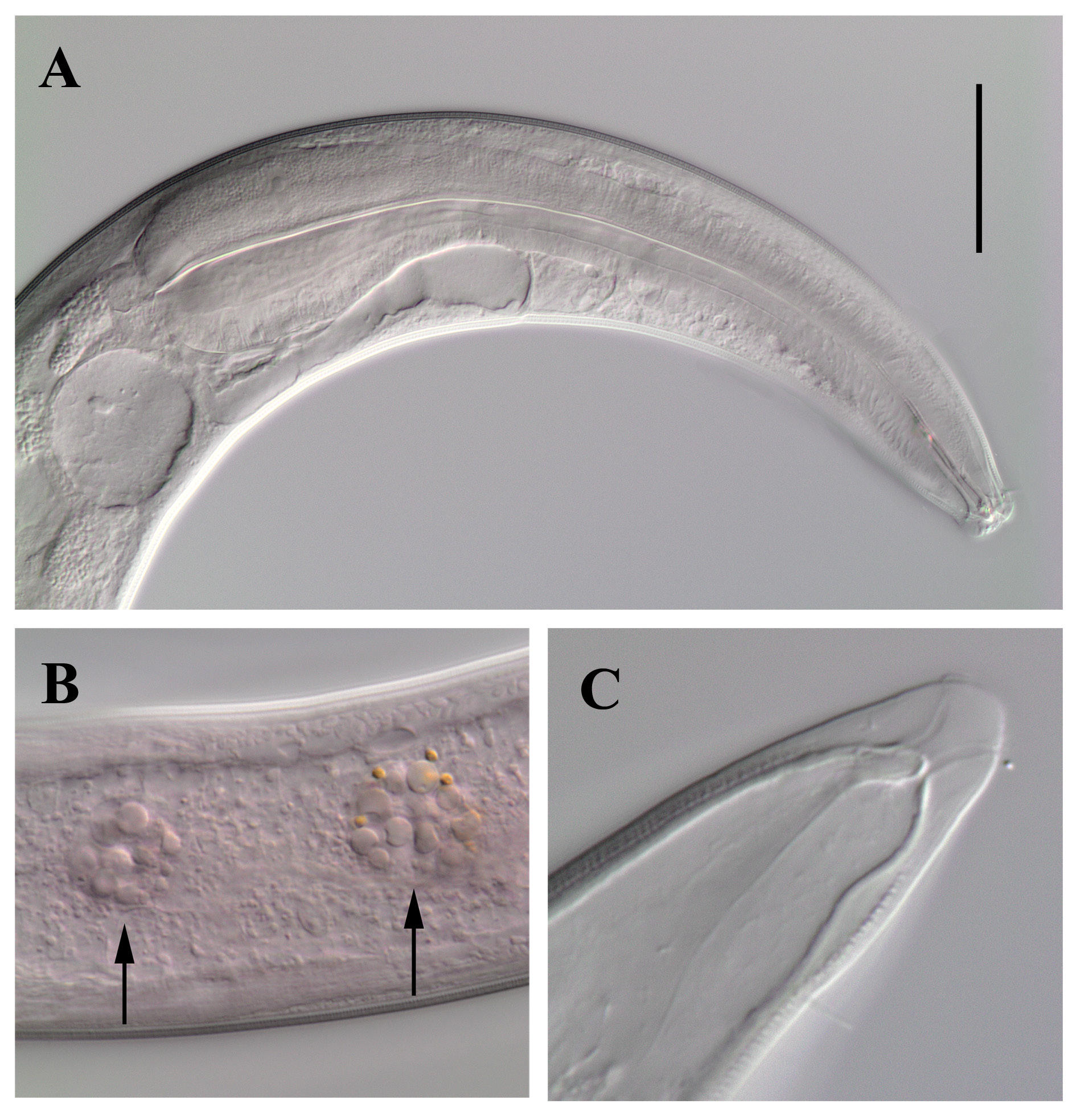
- Hopperia beaglense
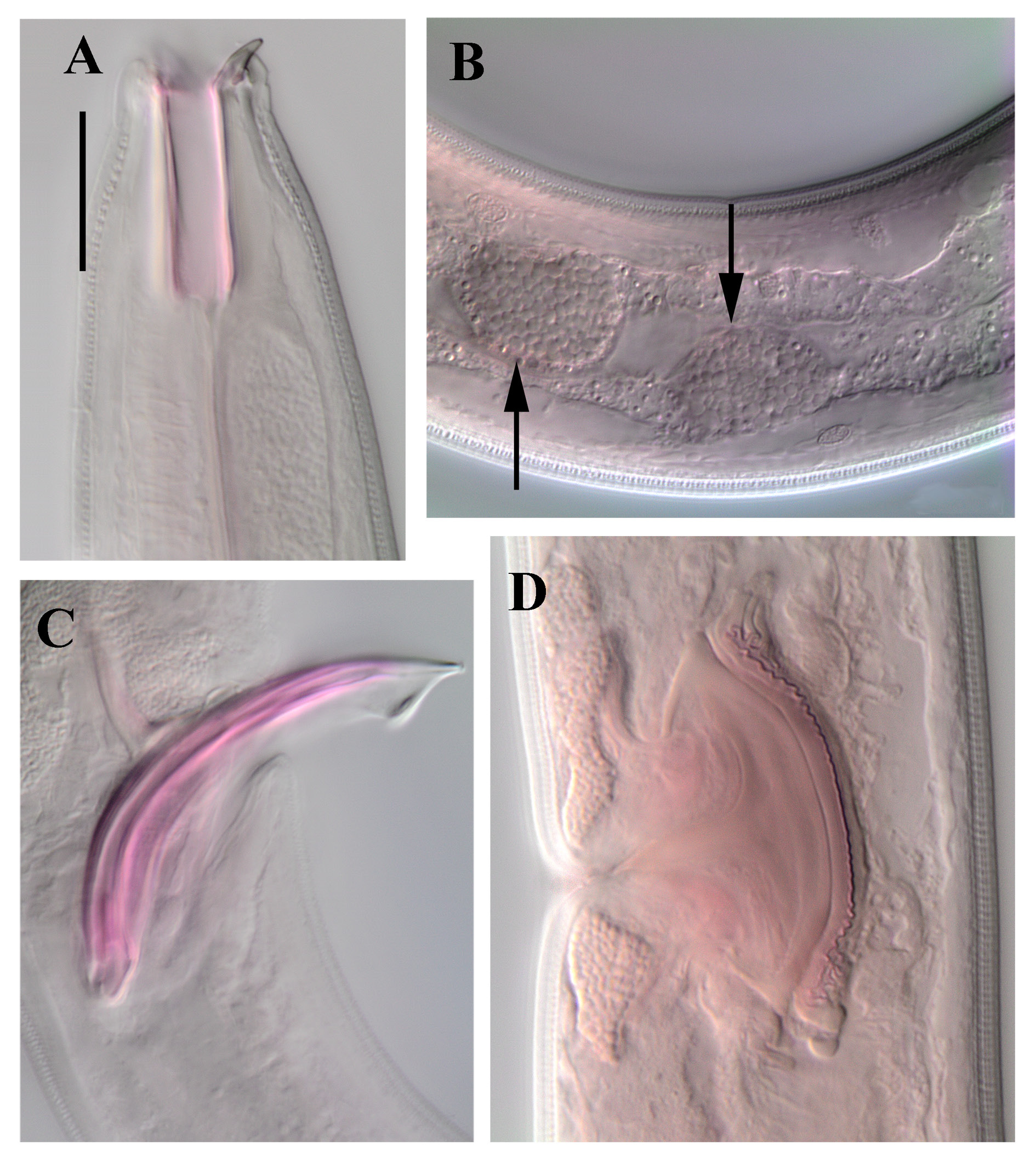
- Hopperia ancora

Scientific classification
- Kingdom: Animalia
- Phylum: Nematoda
- Class: Chromadorea
- Order: Araeolaimida
- Family: Comesomatidae
- Genus: Hopperia; Vitiello, 1969

Diversity
- 18 species, see text

= Hopperia =

Genus of nematodes

Hopperia is a genus of chromadorid nematodes that belongs to the family Comesomatidae.

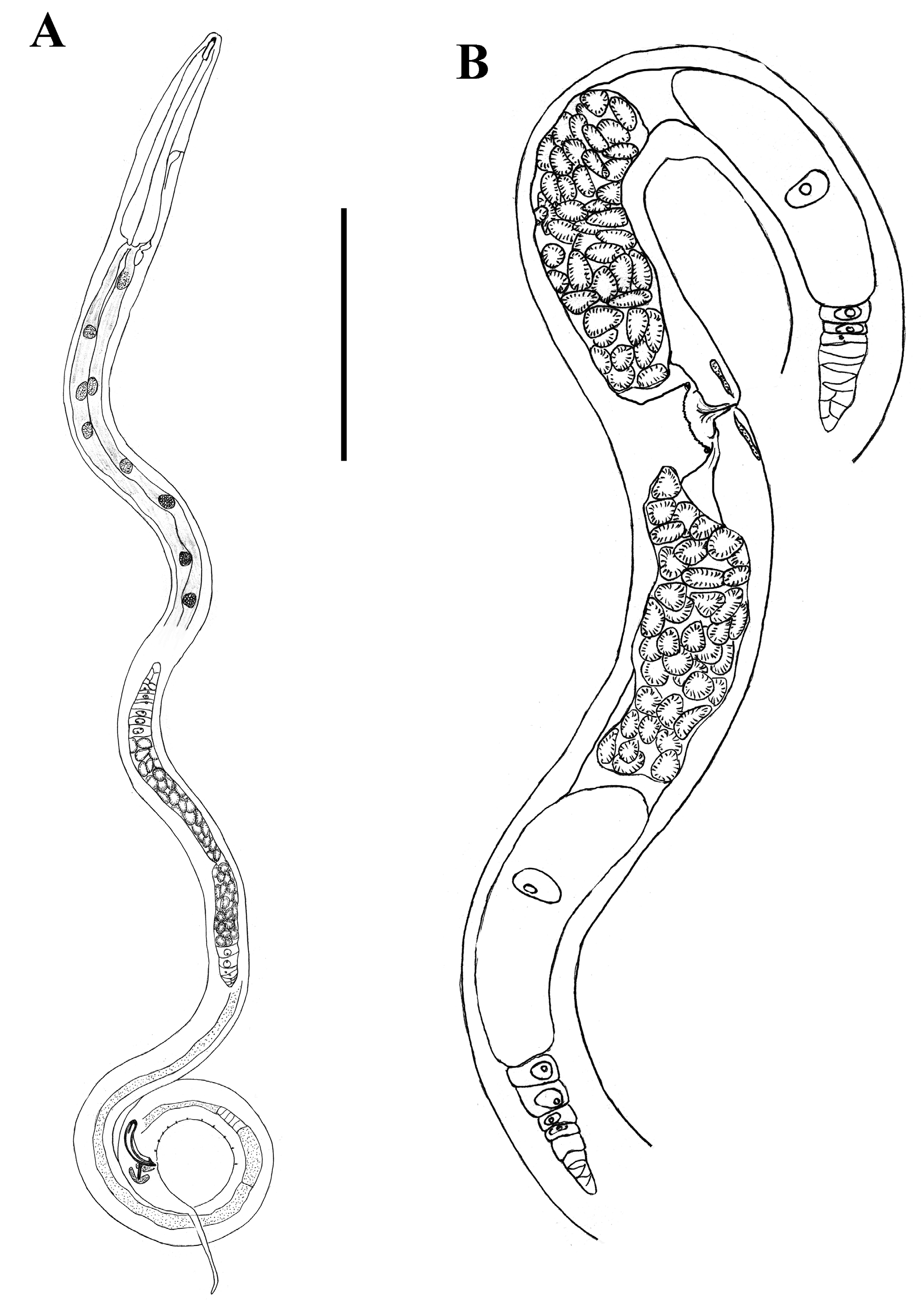
Hopperia ancora

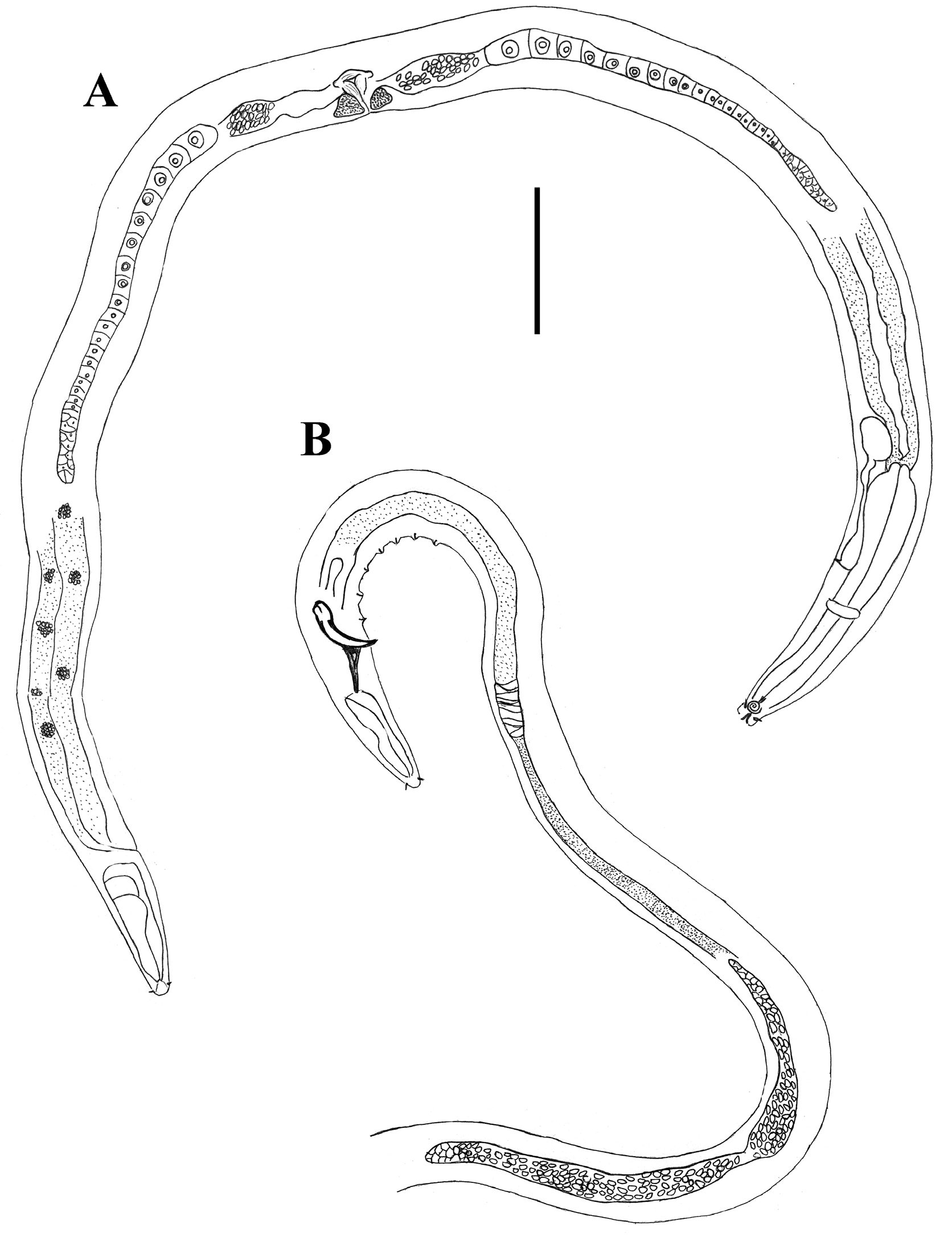
Hopperia beaglense

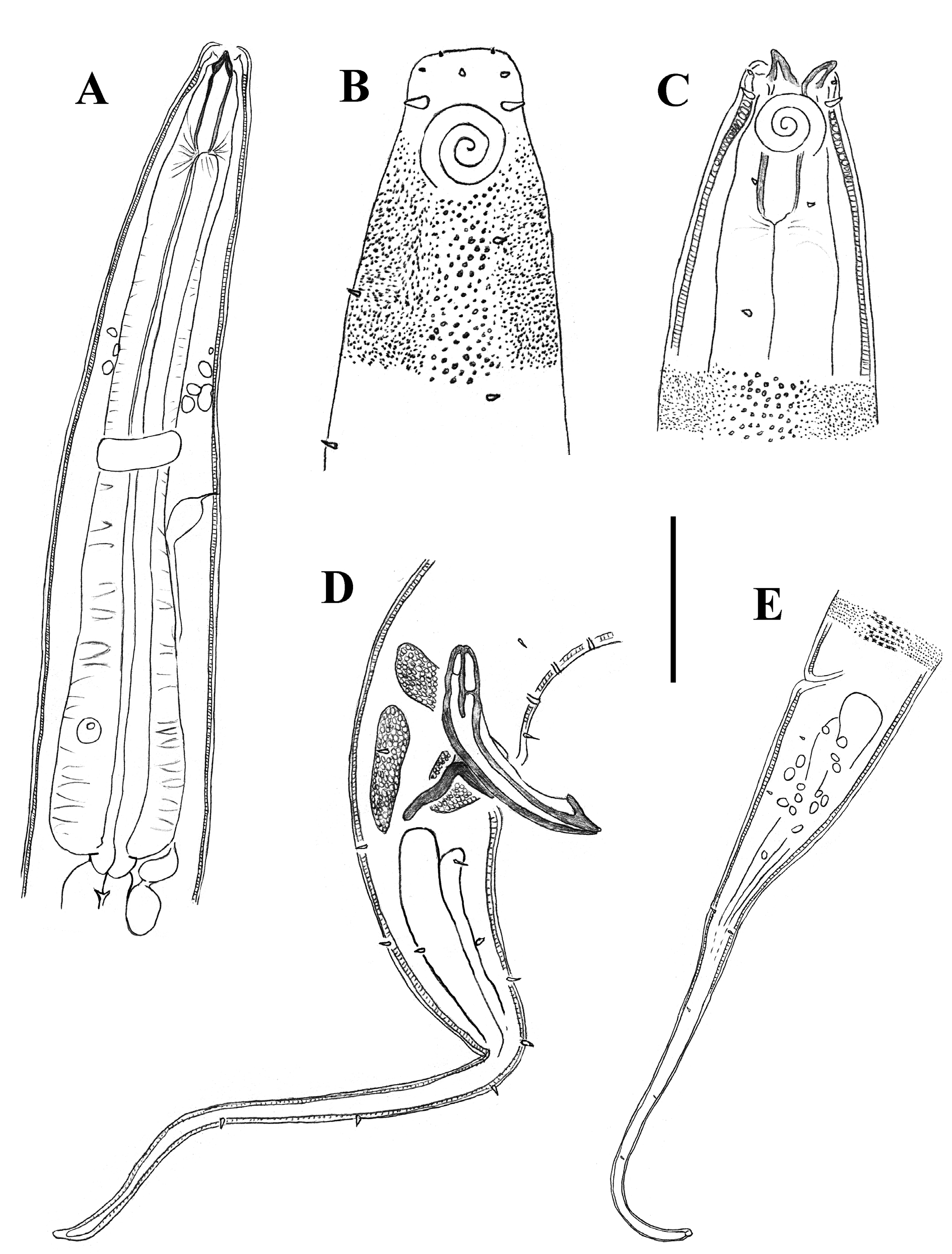
H. ancora

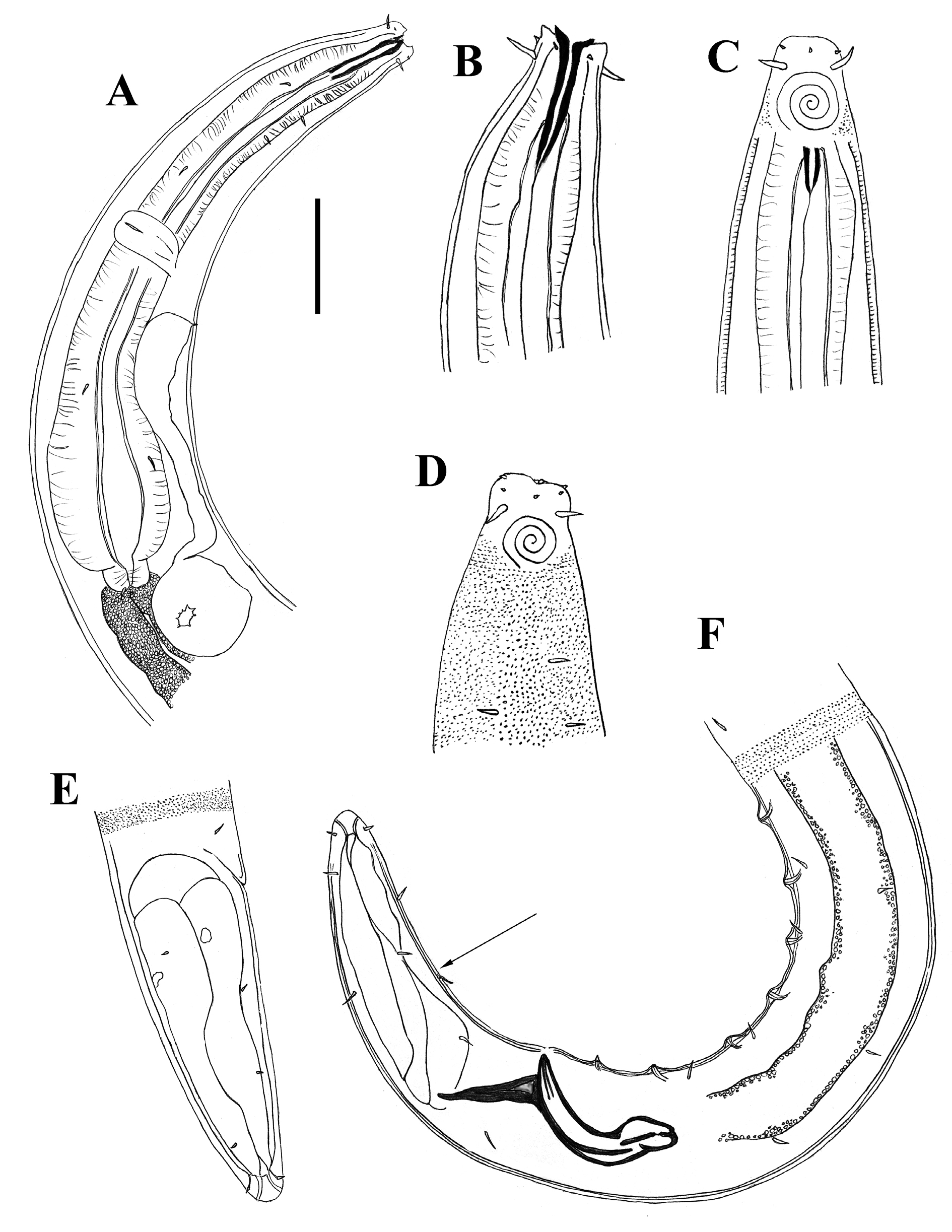
B. beaglense

== Distribution ==
The genus has cosmopolitan distribution.

== Taxonomy ==
The genus is a chromadorid nematode of the order Araeolaimida. It is more specifically a member of the family Comesomatidae. The species H. metatypica was originally described as a member of the genus Dorylaimopsis. However several studies have moved it to this genus due to its lateral differentiation consisting of larger, irregularly-distributed coarse dots.

=== Species ===
This genus currently contains 18 described species. A list of them can be found below:

- Hopperia americana Pastor de Ward, 1984
- Hopperia ancora Leduc, 2012
- Hopperia arntzi Chen & Vincx, 1998
- Hopperia australis Jensen, 1992
- Hopperia beaglense Chen & Vincx, 1998
- Hopperia communis Gagarin & Nguyen Vu Thanh, 2006
- Hopperia dolichura Gagarin & Nguyen Vu Thanh, 2006
- Hopperia dorylaimopsoides Allgén, 1959
- Hopperia hexadentata Hope & Zhang, 1995
- Hopperia indiana Muthumbi, Soetaert & Vincx, 1997
- Hopperia macramphida Sun, Huang & Huang, 2018
- Hopperia massiliensis Vitiello, 1969
- Hopperia metatypica Chitwood, 1936
- Hopperia mira Gagarin & Nguyen Vu Thanh, 2006
- Hopperia muscatensis Warwick, 1973
- Hopperia novazelandica Fu & Leduc, 2019
- Hopperia patagonica Pastor de Ward, 2004
- Hopperia sinensis Guo, Chang, Chen, Li & Liu, 2015
