= Richtersiidae =

Scientific classification
- Kingdom: Animalia
- Phylum: Nematoda
- Class: Chromadorea
- Order: Desmodorida
- Suborder: Desmodorina
- Superfamily: Desmodoroidea
- Family: Richtersiidae; Kreis, 1929

Family of nematodes

Richtersiidae is a family of nematodes belonging to the order Desmodorida.

Genera:

- Desmotersia Neira & Decraemer, 2009
- Richtersia Steiner, 1916
