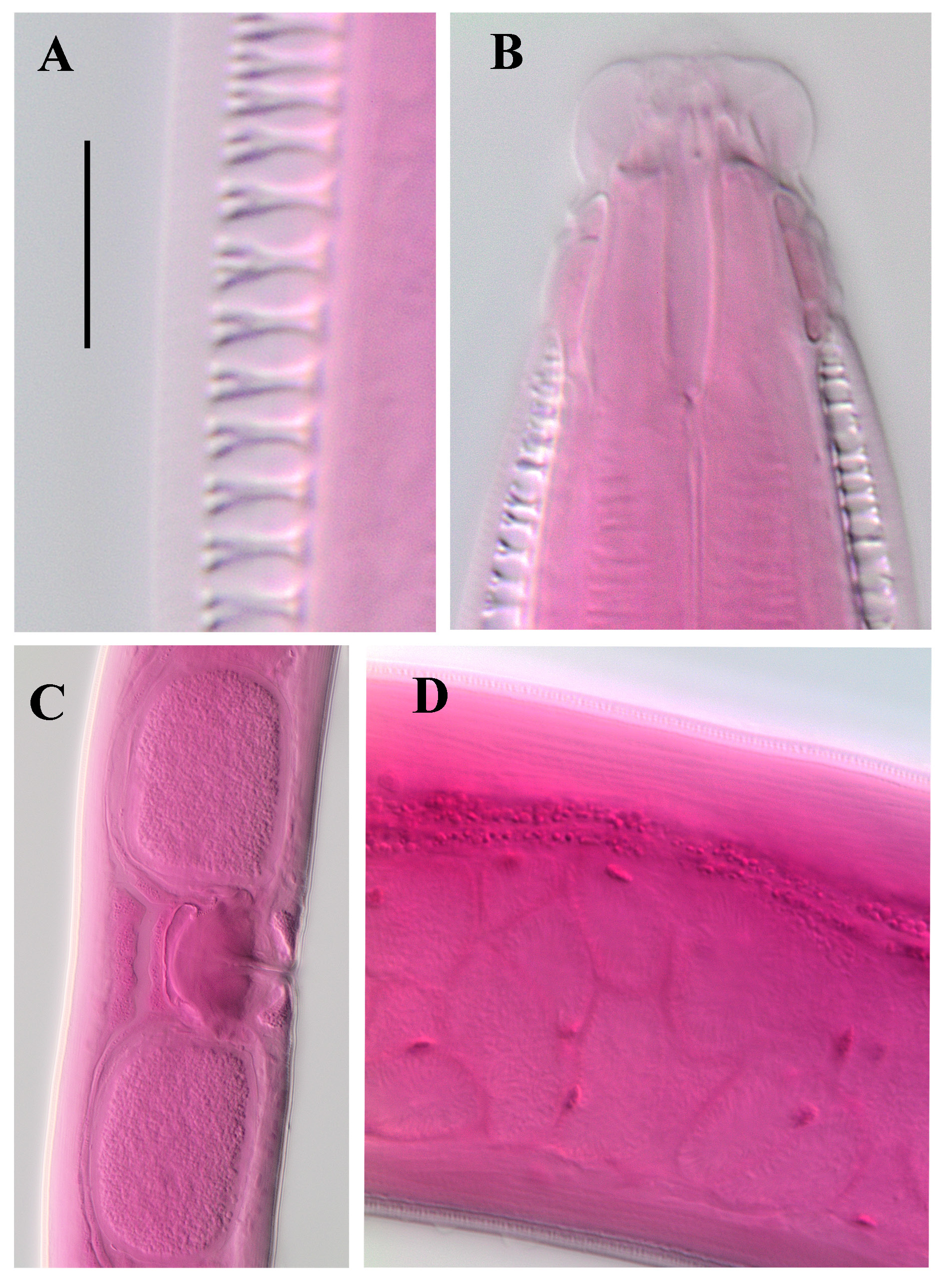
- Dorylaimopsis nodderi

Scientific classification
- Kingdom: Animalia
- Phylum: Nematoda
- Class: Chromadorea
- Order: Araeolaimida
- Family: Comesomatidae
- Genus: Dorylaimopsis; Ditlevsen, 1918

Diversity
- 31 species, see text

Synonyms
- Mesonchium Cobb, 1920; Pepsonema Cobb, 1920; Xinema Cobb, 1920

= Dorylaimopsis =

Genus of nematodes

Dorylaimopsis is a genus of chromadorid nematode that belongs to the family Comesomatidae.

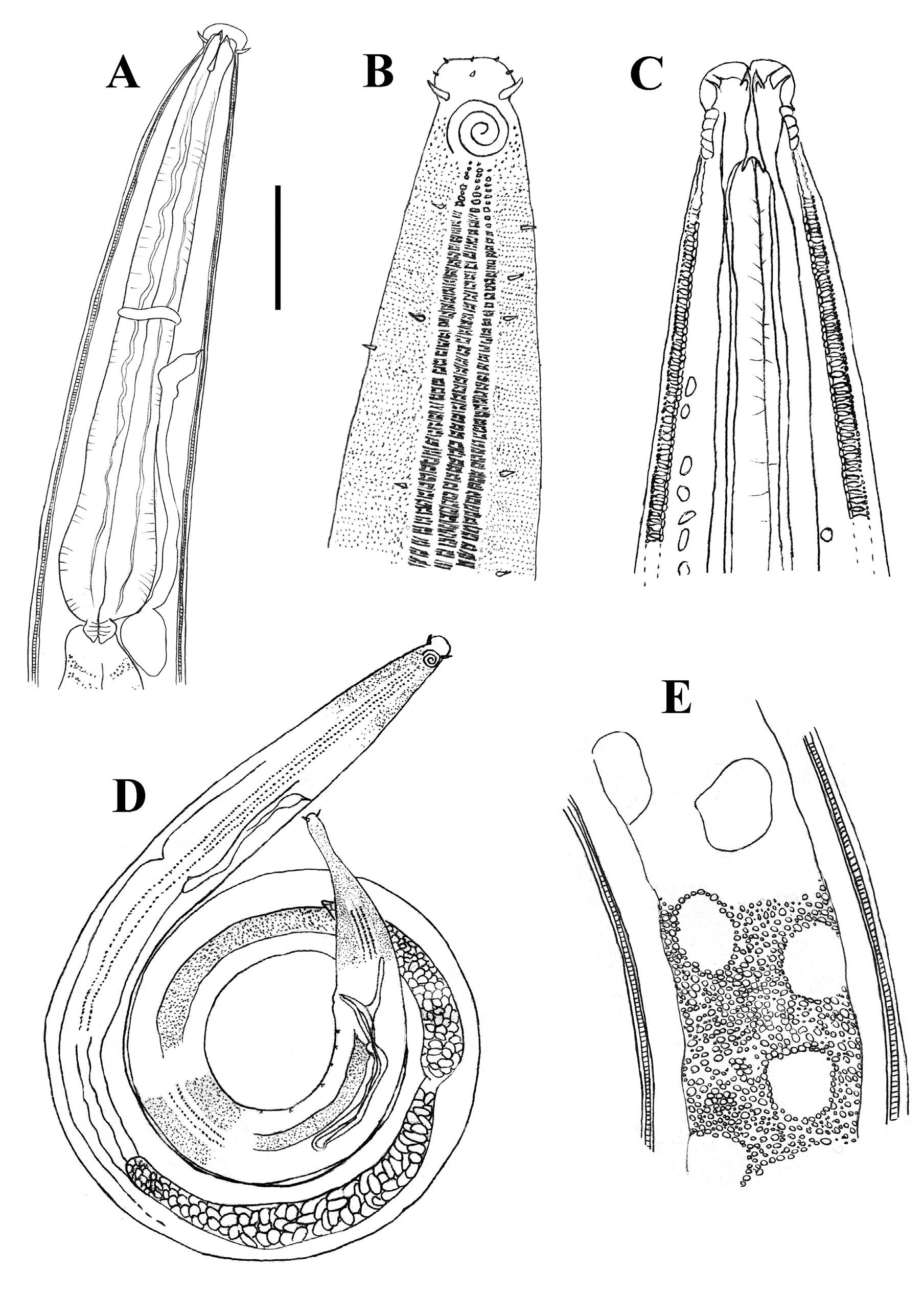
Anterior region of Dorylaimopsis nodderi

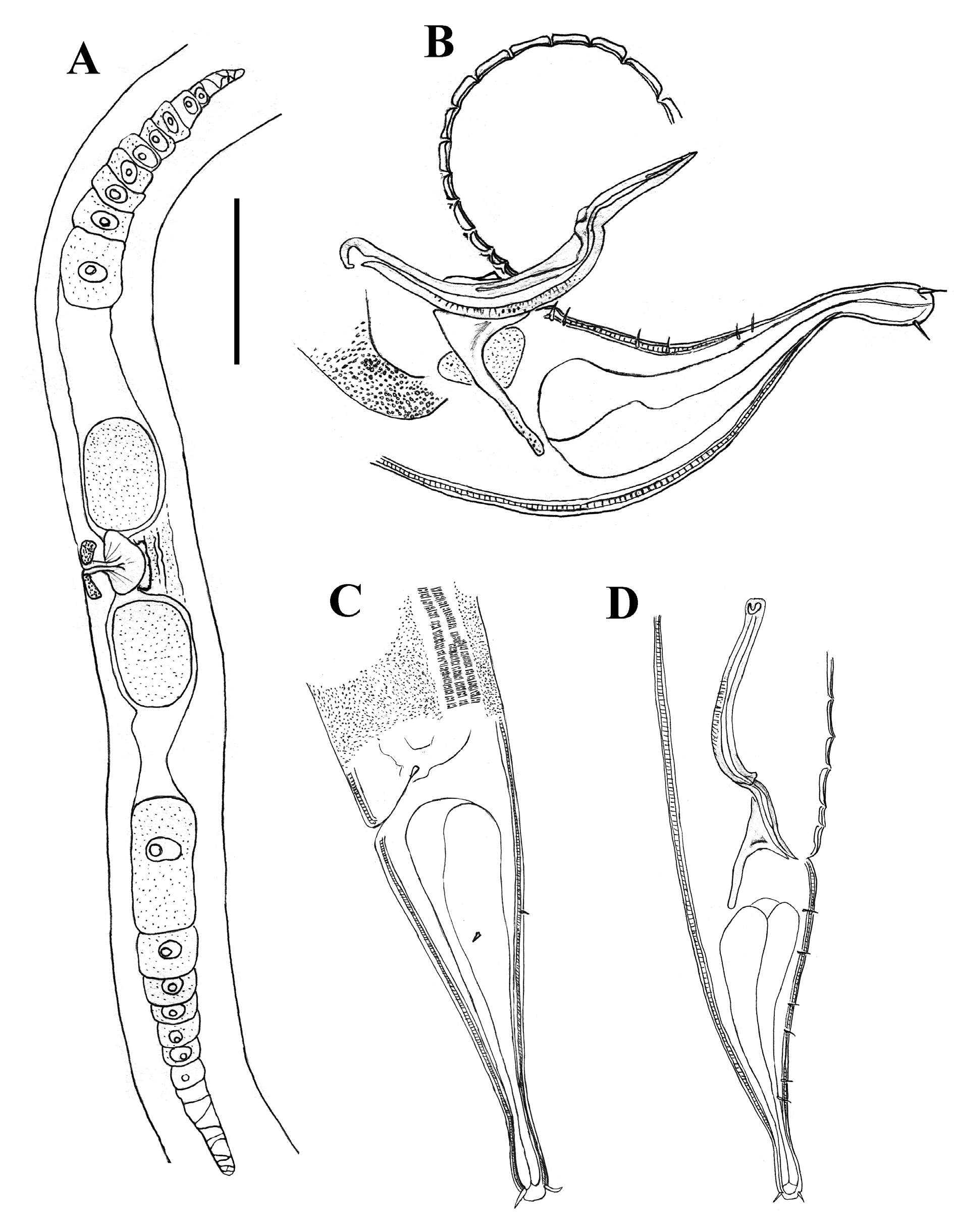
Reproductive system of Dorylaimopsis nodderi

== Distribution ==
The genus has cosmopolitan distribution meaning it can be found worldwide. There are currently seven species that inhabit the sea of China (D. boucheri, D. heteroapophysis, D. jinmendaoica, D. longispicula, D. papilla, D. rabalaisi and D. turneri). The Yellow Sea currently contains two species, D. sinica and D. zhangi. This genus was also abundant in the Gulf of Mexico along with Sabatieria, Pselionema, Tricoma, and Halalaimus.

They are common, often the dominant nematodes fauna, inhabitants of muddy intertidal and subtidal sediments.

== Taxonomy ==
The genus is a chromadorid nematode of the order Araeolaimida. It is more specifically a member of the family Comesomatidae.

There are several synonymized names under this genus. They are Mesonchium, Pepsonema and Xinema. The species D. metatypica Chitwood, 1936 is most likely a member of the genus Hopperia due to its lateral differentiation that consists of larger, irregularly-distributed coarse dots as in Hopperia. It has been place in that genus by several studies (see: Hopperia metatypica).

=== Species ===
Currently, there are 31 described species. Below is a list species belonging to this genus:

- Dorylaimopsis angelae (Inglis, 1967)
- Dorylaimopsis boucheri Fu, Leduc, Rao & Cai, 2019
- Dorylaimopsis brevispiculata Gagarin, 2013
- Dorylaimopsis coomansi Muthumbi, Soetaert & Vincx, 1997
- Dorylaimopsis euryonchus (Wieser, 1954)
- Dorylaimopsis gerardi Muthumbi, Soetaert & Vincx, 1997
- Dorylaimopsis halongensis Nguyen Dinh Tu, Nguyen Vu Thanh, Smol & Vanreusel, 2008
- Dorylaimopsis hawaiiensis Allgen, 1951
- Dorylaimopsis heteroapophysis Huang, Sun & Huang, 2018
- Dorylaimopsis intermedia Gagarin, 2013
- Dorylaimopsis janetae (Inglis, 1963)
- Dorylaimopsis jinyuei Fu, Leduc, Rao & Cai, 2019
- Dorylaimopsis longispicula Fu, Leduc, Rao & Cai, 2019
- Dorylaimopsis magellanense Chen & Vincx, 1998
- Dorylaimopsis mediterranea Grimaldi-De Zio, 1968
- Dorylaimopsis nini (Inglis, 1961)
- Dorylaimopsis nodderi Leduc, 2012
- Dorylaimopsis papilla Guo, Chang & Yang, 2018
- Dorylaimopsis peculiaris Platonova, 1971
- Dorylaimopsis pellucidum (Cobb, 1920)
- Dorylaimopsis perfecta (Cobb, 1920)
- Dorylaimopsis poriferum (Cobb, 1920)
- Dorylaimopsis punctata Ditlevsen, 1918
- Dorylaimopsis rabalaisi Zhang, 1992
- Dorylaimopsis sinica Mian Huang & Xueqing Li, 2026
- Dorylaimopsis timmi (Timm, 1961)
- Dorylaimopsis tumida Gagarin & Nguyen Vu Thanh, 2006
- Dorylaimopsis turneri Zhang, 1992
- Dorylaimopsis variabilis Muthumbi, Soetaert & Vincx, 1997
- Dorylaimopsis zhangi Mian Huang & Xueqing Li, 2026
