= Löb Nevakhovich =

Russian writer (died 1831)

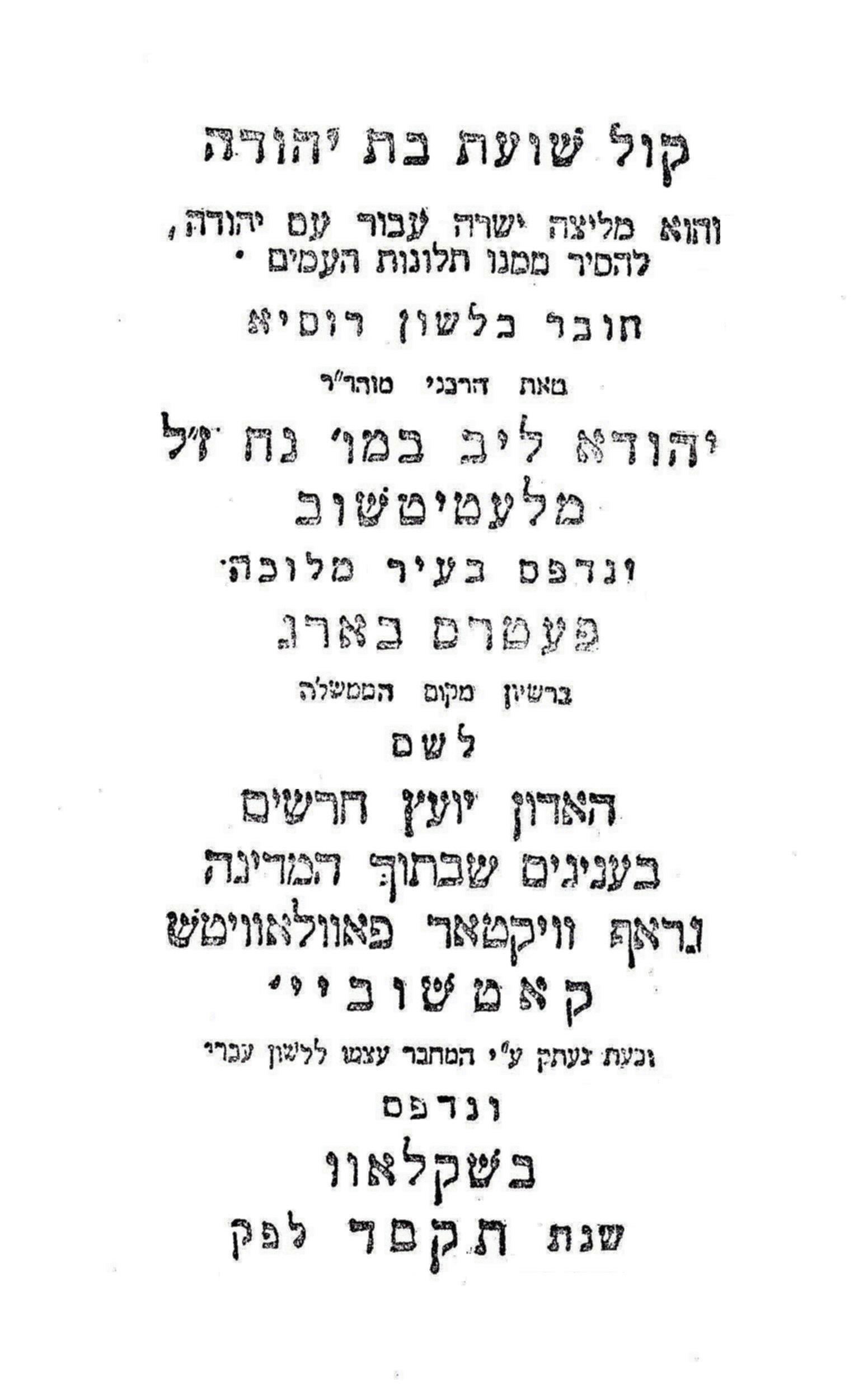
Kol Shave'at Bat Yehuda by Löb Nevakhovich, Hebrew version, St. Peterburg 1804

Löb Nevakhovich or Lev Nikolayevich (Leib ben Noach) Nevakhovich (Russian: Лев Николаевич (Лейб Бен Ноах) Невахович; born between 1776 and 1778, Letychiv, Podolia – 13 August [O.S. 1 August] 1831, Saint Petersburg) was a Russian writer and one of the first maskilim in Russia.

Nevakhovich was friend and protégé of Abram Peretz. He went to St. Petersburg toward the end of Catherine II's reign, and engaged in commercial pursuits, then turned to literature. He gained a mastery of the Russian language, starting with translations from German, Hebrew and Swedish. Nevakhovich was a linguist, a student of philosophy, and an ardent admirer of Moses Mendelssohn. Nevakhovich held patriotic views regarding both his Jewish heritage and the Russian Empire, expressing his gratitude for opportunities of growth. He also was optimistic in regard to the future of the Jews and assumed that they would be granted greater liberty. In 1806, Nevakhovich was baptized into the Lutheran Church (Russian Orthodox according to other sources). In 1817, he moved to Warsaw, where he started working for the Ministry of Finance. In 1831 he returned to St. Petersburg in order to produce one of his plays on the stage, but he died before he could accomplish his purpose. Nevakhovich is interred in Volkovo Cemetery in St. Petersburg.

== Works ==
Nevakhovich, with his friends Abram Peretz and Noah Notkin, made a determined effort to secure recognition for the Jews of Russia. Under the title Vopl' Dshcheri Iudeiskoi (Russian for Lament of the Daughter of Israel) he wrote an urgent appeal to the people of Russia, calling upon them to show a spirit of tolerance and justice toward Jews. In this appeal he shows how the Jewish people have been maligned, and insists that the Jewish religion tends to produce good men and good citizens: "For centuries, the Jews have been accused by the peoples of the earth. They have been accused of witchcraft, of irreligion, of superstition ... All their actions were interpreted to their disadvantage, and whenever they were discovered to be innocent their accusers raised against them new accusations ... I swear that the Jew who preserves his religion undefiled can be neither a bad man nor a bad citizen."

In 1804, Nevakhovich published Perepiska Dvukh Prosvyeschonnykh Druzei (Russian for Correspondence of Two Enlightened Friends); other writings followed in 1805 and 1806. He became close to Prince Alexander Shakhovskoy, a dramatist. Nevakhovich's play Sulioty ili Spartantzy XVIII Vyeka (Russian for Sulliots, or Spartans of the 18th century) was successfully produced at the Imperial Theater in St. Petersburg in 1809, and was performed before the emperor in October of the same year. His Mech Pravosudiya (Russian for The Sword of Justice) was put on the stage after his death in 1831.

== Descendants ==
- Son Michael Nevakhovich (1817–1850) after pursuing a military career left it with the rank of Rittmeister and started publishing drawings and comical illustrations later becoming an editor of the first Russian comic paper Yeralash.
- Son Alexander Nevakhovich (1819–1880) became manager of theatrical department and was associated with theatrical director Gedeonov; Alexander's son Nicholas became an officer in the Russian Navy.
- Daughter Emilia was the mother of Nobel laureate scientist Ilya Ilyich Mechnikov.
