= Cervonema =

- Cervonema kaikouraensis

Scientific classification
- Kingdom: Animalia
- Phylum: Nematoda
- Class: Chromadorea
- Order: Araeolaimida
- Family: Comesomatidae
- Genus: Cervonema; Wieser, 1954

Genus of nematodes

Cervonema is a genus of nematodes belonging to the family Comesomatidae.

The genus has almost cosmopolitan distribution.

Species:

- Cervonema allometricum Wieser, 1954
- Cervonema brevicauda Gourbault, 1980
- Cervonema chilensis Chen & Vincx, 2000
- Cervonema donghaensis Hong, Tchesunov & Lee, 2016
- Cervonema gourbaulti Muthumbi, Soetaert & Vincx, 1997
- Cervonema hermani Chen & Vincx, 2000
- Cervonema jenseni Gourbault, 1980
- Cervonema kaikouraensis Leduc, 2012
- Cervonema longispicula Huang, Jia & Huang, 2018
- Cervonema macramphis Jensen, 1979
- Cervonema memorabile Bussau, 1993
- Cervonema minutus Muthumbi, Soetaert & Vincx, 1997
- Cervonema multispira Leduc, 2012
- Cervonema papillatum Jensen, 1988
- Cervonema proberti Leduc, 2012
- Cervonema proximamphidum Tchesunov, 2000
- Cervonema pseudodeltensis Barnes, Kim & Lee, 2012
- Cervonema shiae Chen & Vincx, 2000
- Cervonema tenuicaudatum (Schuurmans Stekhoven, 1950) Wieser, 1954
