= Élie Metchnikoff =

Russian immunologist (1845–1916)

- Илья Мечников
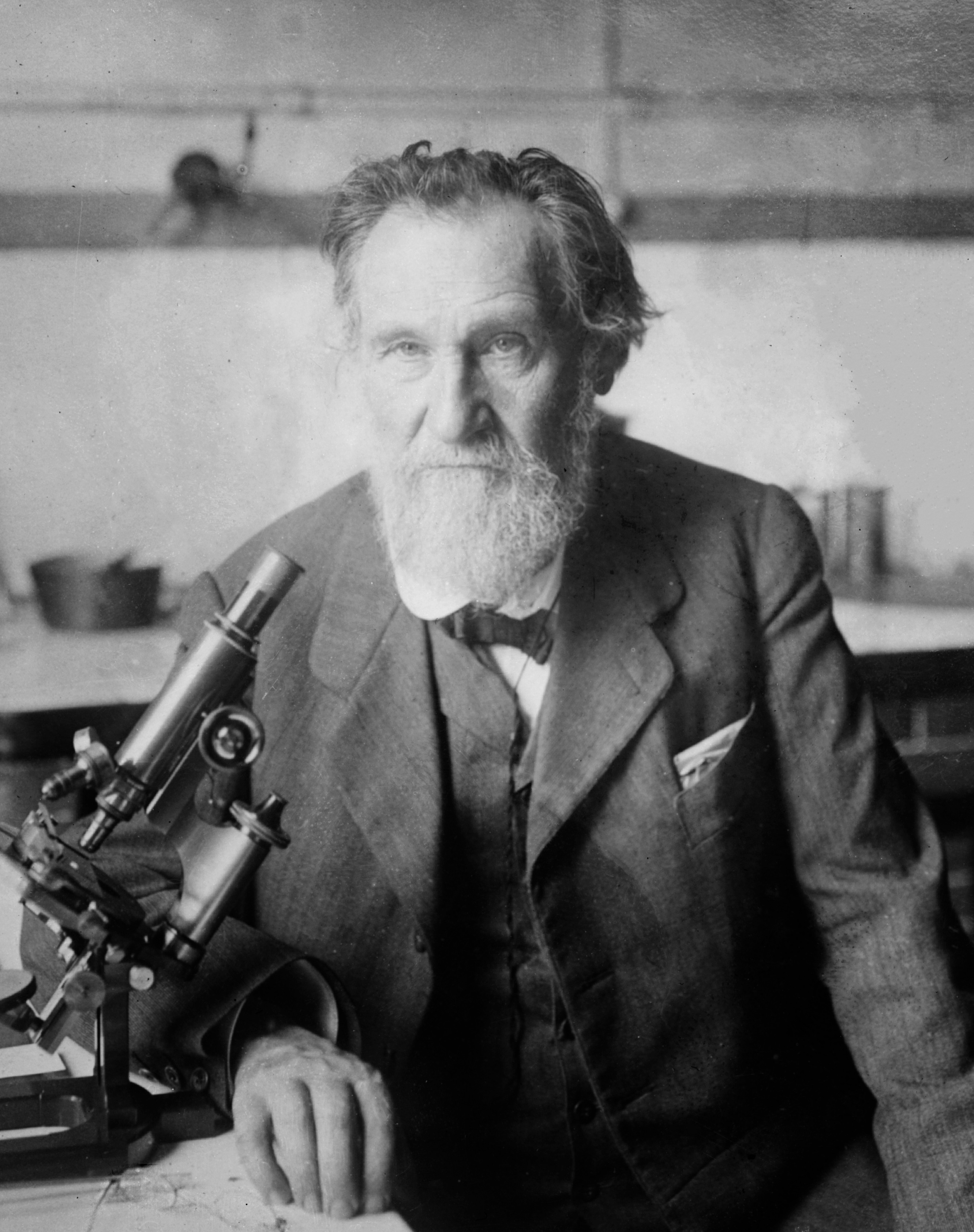
- Metchnikoff c. 1910–1915
- Born: Ilya Ilyich Mechnikov; 15 May [O.S. 3 May] 1845; Ivanovka, Kharkov Governorate, Russian Empire
- Died: 15 July 1916 (aged 71); Paris, France
- Education: Kharkov University; University of Giessen; University of Göttingen; University of Messina; Ludwig-Maximilians-Universität München; University of Saint Petersburg
- Known for: Phagocytosis; cell-mediated immunity; gerontology
- Awards: Copley Medal (1906); Nobel Prize in Physiology or Medicine (1908); Albert Medal (1916)
- Scientific career
- Fields: Zoology; immunology; gerontology
- Workplaces: Imperial Novorossiya University; University of Saint Petersburg; Pasteur Institute; Kharkov University
- Author abbrev. (zoology): Metschnikoff, Mechnikov

Signature
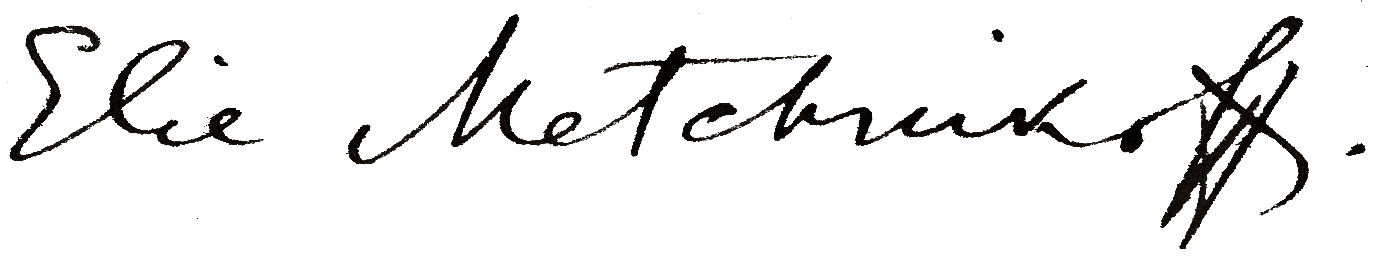

Ilya Ilyich Mechnikov (Note: (Note: In this name that follows East Slavic naming customs, the patronymic is Ilyich and the family name is Mechnikov.) Russian: Илья Ильич Мечников; Ukrainian: Ілля Ілліч Мечников, romanized: Illya Illich Mechnikov.) (15 May [O.S. 3 May] 1845 (Note: Some sources give Metchnikoff's new-style birth date as 16 May, but this is believed by the Nobel Prize Committee to be an error stated by Metchnikoff himself in converting a nineteenth century date from old-style to new-style.) – 15 July 1916), gallicised and known in Western sources as Élie Metchnikoff, was a zoologist from the Russian Empire of Moldavian noble ancestry best known for his research in immunology (study of immune systems) and thanatology (study of death). He and Paul Ehrlich were jointly awarded the 1908 Nobel Prize in Physiology or Medicine "in recognition of their work on immunity".

Mechnikov was born in a region of the Russian Empire that is today part of modern-day Ukraine to a Moldavian noble father and a Ukrainian-Jewish mother. He later moved to France. Given this complex heritage, five different nations and peoples lay claim to Metchnikoff. Despite having a mother of Jewish origin, he was baptized Russian Orthodox, although he later became an atheist.

Honoured as the "father of innate immunity", Metchnikoff was the first to discover a process of immunity called phagocytosis and the cell responsible for it, called phagocyte, specifically macrophage, in 1882. This discovery turned out to be the major defence mechanism in innate immunity, as well as the foundation of the concept of cell-mediated immunity, while Ehrlich established the concept of humoral immunity to complete the principles of immune system. Their works are regarded as the foundation of the science of immunology.

Metchnikoff developed one of the earliest concepts in ageing, and advocated the use of lactic acid bacteria (Lactobacillus) for healthy and long life. This became the concept of probiotics in medicine. Mechnikov is also credited with coining the term gerontology in 1903 for the emerging study of aging and longevity. In this regard, Ilya Mechnikov is called the "father of gerontology" (although, as often happens in science, the same title is sometimes applied to multiple people who contributed to aging research).

Supporters of life extension celebrate 15 May as Metchnikoff Day and use it as a memorable date for organizing activities.

== Early life, family and education ==
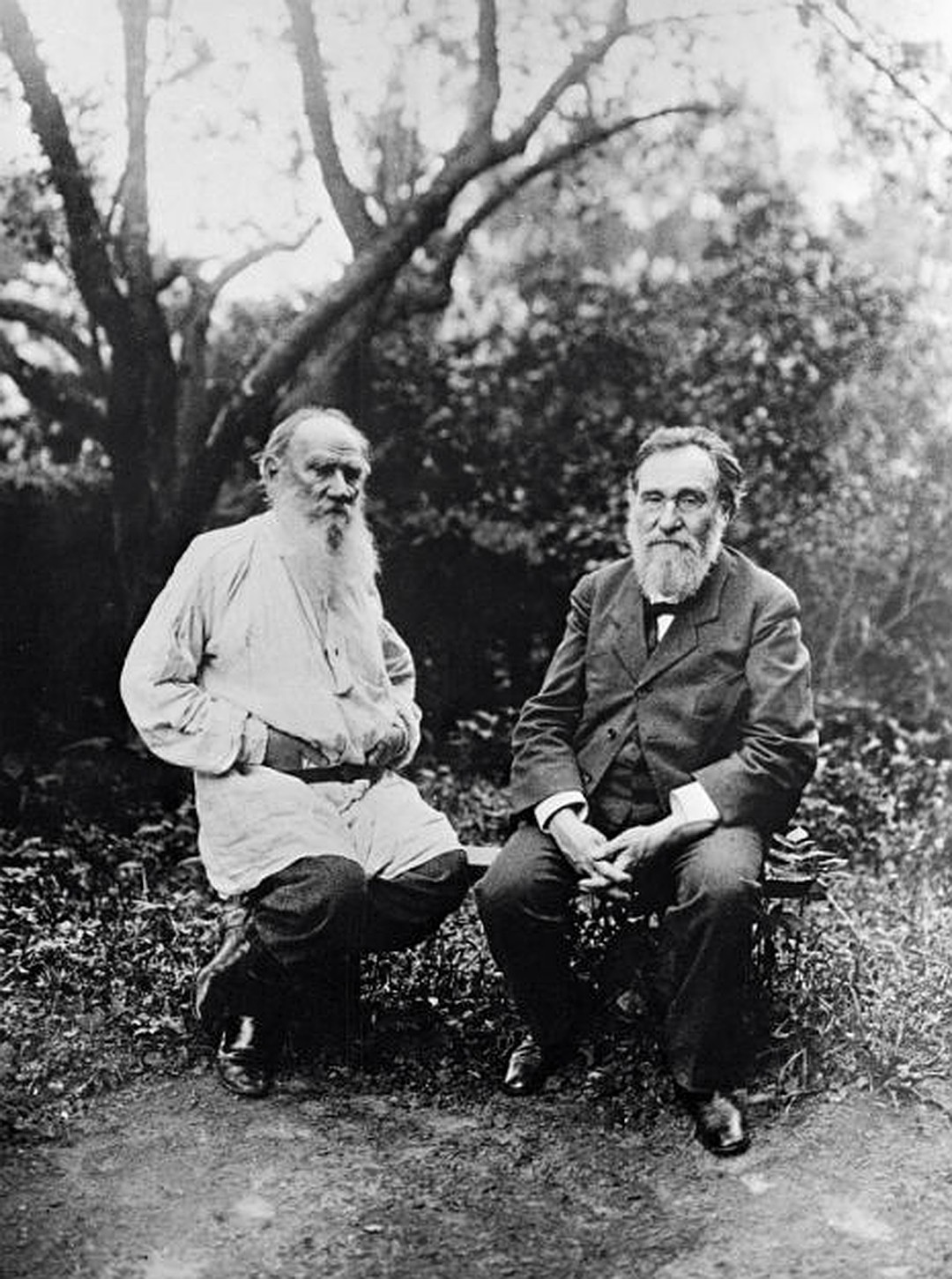
Leo Tolstoy (left) and Metchnikoff

Metchnikoff was born in the village of Ivanovka, Kharkov Governorate, in the Russian Empire, now located in Kupiansk Raion, Kharkiv Oblast in Ukraine. He was the youngest of five children of Ilya Ivanovich Mechnikov, an officer of the Imperial Guard. His mother, Emilia Lvovna (Nevakhovich), the daughter of the writer Leo Nevakhovich, largely influenced him on his education, especially in science. The Nevakhovich family was Jewish.

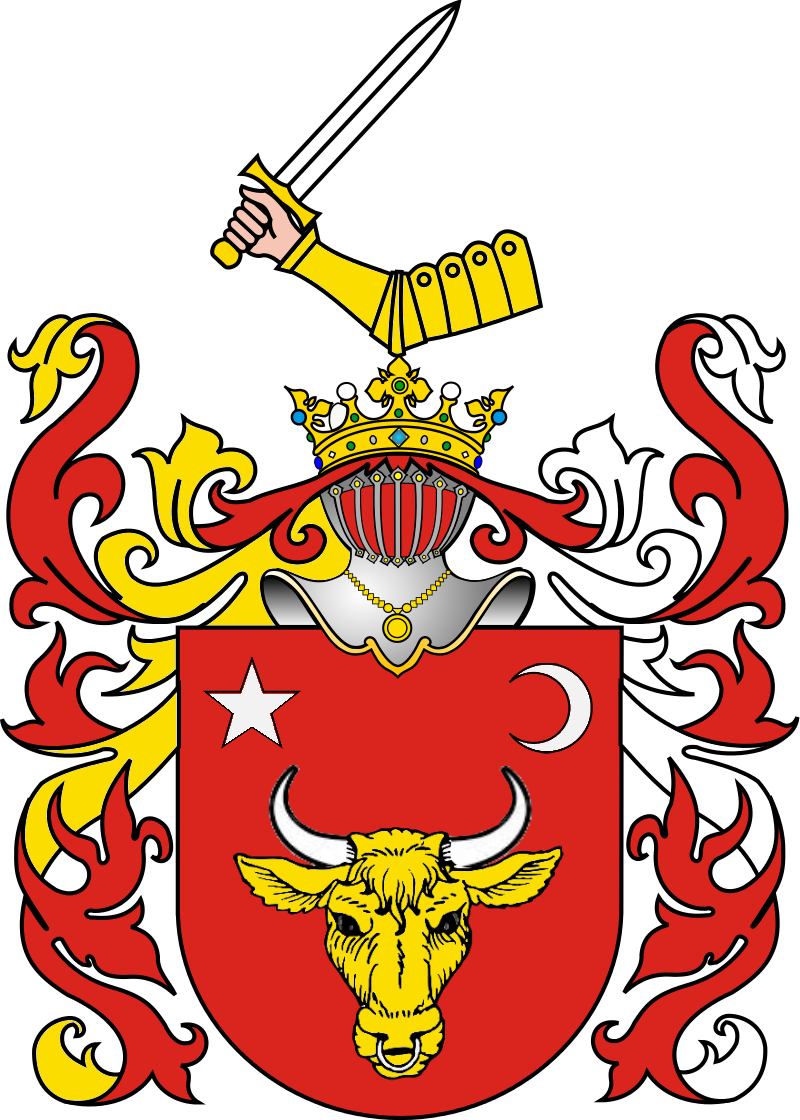
Coat of Arms of the Mechnikov family

The family name Mechnikov is a translation from Romanian, since his father was a descendant of the Chancellor Yuri Stefanovi, the grandson of Nicolae Milescu Spătarul. Yuri Stefanovich immigrated to Russia together with Dimitrie Cantemir in 1711 after the unsuccessful campaign of Peter I on the Danubian Principalities. For two and a half centuries, the Mechnikov family lived in St. Petersburg, where it became connected by family ties with many Russian princely families. The word "mech" is a Russian translation of the Romanian "spadă" (sword), which originated with Spătar (Sword-bearer). His elder brother Lev became a prominent geographer and sociologist.

In 1856, Metchnikoff entered the Kharkov Lycée, where he developed his interest in biology. Convinced by his mother to study natural sciences instead of medicine, he tried in 1862 to study biology at the University of Würzburg, but the German academic session would not start by the end of the year. Metchnikoff thus enrolled at Kharkov Imperial University for natural sciences, completing his four-year degree in two years.

In 1864, he traveled to Germany to study marine fauna on the small North Sea island of Heligoland. He was advised by the botanist Ferdinand Cohn to work with Rudolf Leuckart at the University of Giessen. It was in Leuckart's laboratory that he made his first scientific discovery of alternation of generations (sexual and asexual) in nematodes (Chaetosomatida) and then at the Ludwig-Maximilians-Universität München. In 1865, while at Giessen, he discovered intracellular digestion in flatworm, and this study influenced his later works. Moving to Naples the next year he worked on a doctoral thesis on the embryonic development of the cuttle-fish Sepiola and the crustacean Nebalia. A cholera epidemic in the autumn of 1865 made him move to the University of Göttingen, where he worked briefly with W. M. Keferstein and Jakob Henle.

In 1867, he returned to Russia to receive his doctorate with Alexander Kovalevsky from the University of Saint Petersburg. Together they won the Karl Ernst von Baer prize for their theses on the development of germ layers in invertebrate embryos.

== Career and achievements ==
Metchnikoff was appointed docent at the newly established Imperial Novorossiya University (now Odesa University). Only twenty-two years of age, he was younger than his students. After being involved in a conflict with a senior colleague over attending scientific meetings, he transferred to the University of Saint Petersburg in 1868, where he experienced a worse professional environment. In 1870 he returned to Odessa to take up the appointment of Titular Professor of Zoology and Comparative Anatomy.

In 1882 he resigned from Odessa University due to political turmoil after the assassination of Alexander II. He went to Sicily to set up his private laboratory in Messina. He returned to Odessa as director of an institute set up to carry out Louis Pasteur's vaccine against rabies; due to some difficulties, he left in 1888 and went to Paris to seek Pasteur's advice. Pasteur gave him an appointment at the Pasteur Institute, where he remained for the rest of his life.

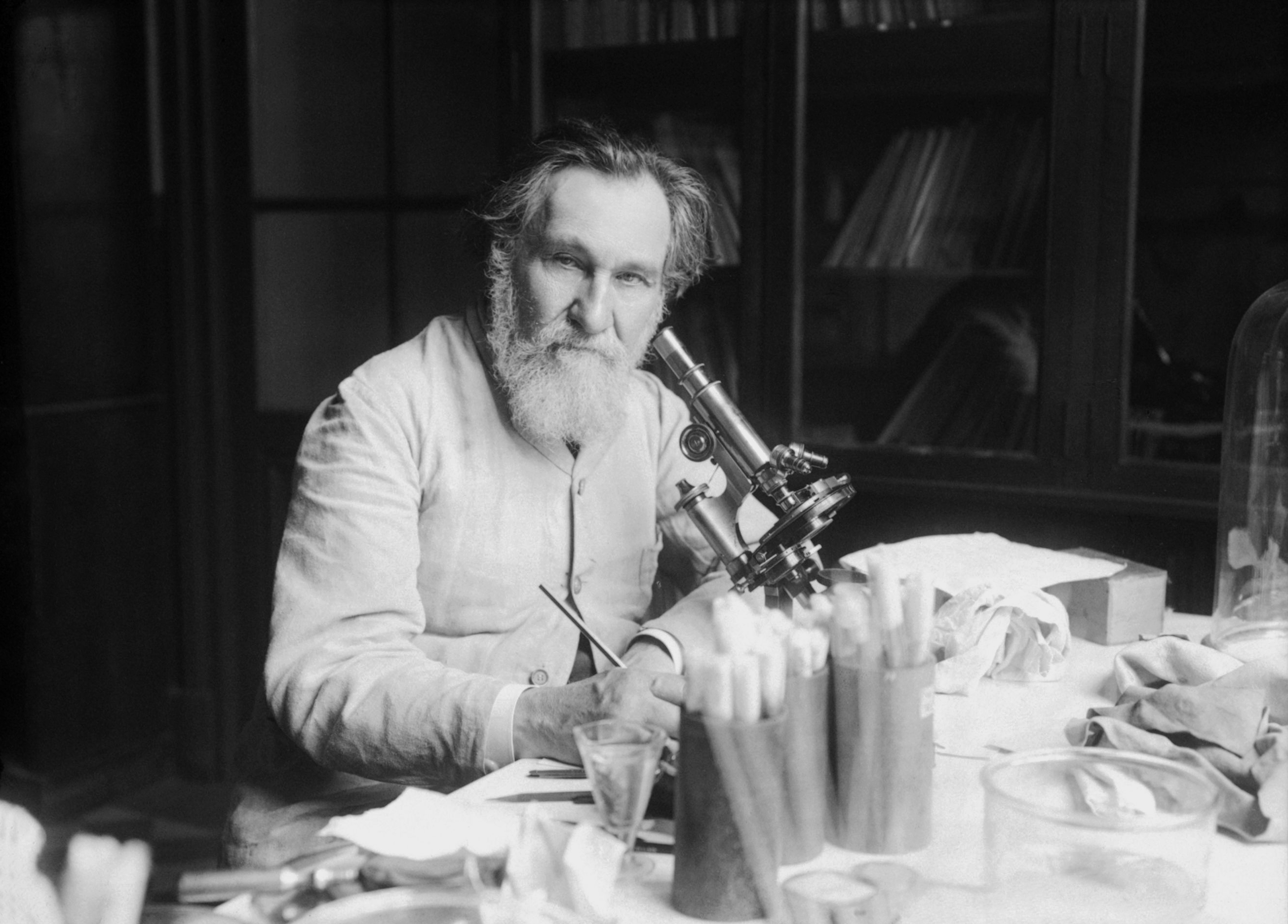
Metchnikoff in his laboratory, 1913

Metchnikoff became interested in the study of microbes, and especially the immune system. At Messina he discovered phagocytosis after experimenting on the larvae of starfish. In 1882 he first demonstrated the process when he inserted small citrus thorns into starfish larvae, then found unusual cells surrounding the thorns. He realized that in animals which have blood, the white blood cells gather at the site of inflammation, and he hypothesised that this could be the process by which bacteria were attacked and killed by the white blood cells. He discussed his hypothesis with Carl Friedrich Wilhelm Claus, Professor of Zoology at the University of Vienna, who suggested to him the term "phagocyte" for a cell which can surround and kill pathogens. He delivered his findings at Odessa University in 1883.

His theory, that certain white blood cells could engulf and destroy harmful bodies such as bacteria, met with scepticism from leading specialists including Louis Pasteur, Emil von Behring, and others. At the time, most bacteriologists believed that white blood cells ingested pathogens and then spread them further through the body. His major supporter was Rudolf Virchow, who published his research in his Archiv für pathologische Anatomie und Physiologie und für klinische Medicin (now called the Virchows Archiv). His discovery of these phagocytes ultimately won him the Nobel Prize in 1908. He worked with Émile Roux on calomel (mercurous chloride) in ointment form in an attempt to prevent people from contracting the sexually transmitted disease syphilis.

In 1887, he observed that leukocytes isolated from the blood of various animals were attracted towards certain bacteria. The first studies of leukocyte killing in the presence of specific antiserum were performed by Joseph Denys and Joseph Leclef, followed by Leon Marchand and Mennes between 1895 and 1898. Almroth E. Wright was the first to quantify this phenomenon and strongly advocated its potential therapeutic importance. The so-called resolution of the humoralist and cellularist positions by showing their respective roles in the setting of enhanced killing in the presence of opsonins was popularized by Wright after 1903, although Metchnikoff acknowledged the stimulatory capacity of immunosensitized serum on phagotic function in the case of acquired immunity.

This attraction was soon proposed to be due to soluble elements released by the bacteria (see Harris for a review of this area up to 1953). Some 85 years after this seminal observation, laboratory studies showed that these elements were low molecular weight (between 150 and 1500 Dalton (unit)s) N-formylated oligopeptides, including the most prominent member of this group, N-formylmethionine-leucyl-phenylalanine, that are made by a variety of replicating gram positive bacteria and gram negative bacteria. Metchnikoff's early observation, then, was the foundation for studies that defined a critical mechanism by which bacteria attract leukocytes to initiate and direct the innate immune response of acute inflammation to sites of host invasion by pathogens.

Metchnikoff discovered fungal infections causing insect death in 1879 and became involved in the biological control of insect pests through his student Isaak Krasilschik. They were able to make use of green muscardine for control of insects in agricultural fields.

Metchnikoff also self-experimented with cholera that initially supported the probiotic notion. During the 1892 cholera epidemic in France, he was surprised by the fact that the disease affected only some people but not others when they were equally exposed to the infection. To understand the differences in susceptibility to the disease, he drank a sample of cholera but never got sick. He tested on two volunteers of which one was not affected while the other almost died. He hypothesised that the difference in cholera infection was due to differences in intestinal microbes, speculating that those who have plenty of beneficial ones would be healthier.

The issues of aging occupied a significant place in Metchnikoff's works. Metchnikoff developed a theory that aging is caused by toxic bacteria in the gut and that lactic acid could prolong life. He attributed the longevity of Bulgarian peasants to their yogurt consumption that contained what was called the Bulgarian bacteria (now called Lactobacillus delbrueckii subsp. bulgaricus). To validate his theory, he drank sour milk every day throughout his life. His scientific reasonings on the subject were written in his books The Nature of Man: Studies in Optimistic Philosophy (1903) and more expressively in The Prolongation of Life: Optimistic Studies (1907). He also espoused the potential life-lengthening properties of lactic acid bacteria such as Lactobacillus delbrueckii subsp. bulgaricus. This concept of probiotics, which he termed "orthobiosis," was influential in his lifetime, but became ignored until the mid-1990s when experimental evidence emerged.

== Awards and recognitions ==
Metchnikoff won the Karl Ernst von Baer prize in 1867 with Alexander Kovalevsky on the basis of their doctoral research. He shared the Nobel Prize in Physiology or Medicine in 1908 with Paul Ehrlich. He was awarded an honorary degree by the University of Cambridge in Cambridge, UK, and the Copley Medal of the Royal Society in 1906. He was given honorary memberships of the Academy of Medicine in Paris and of the Academy of Sciences and Medicine in Saint Petersburg as well as Honorary membership of the Manchester Literary and Philosophical Society who presented him with the Wilde Medal in 1901.

=== Institutions ===
- The Leningrad Medical Institute of Hygiene and Sanitation, founded in 1911, merged with the Saint Petersburg State Medical Academy of Postgraduate Studies in 2011 to become the North-Western State Medical University named after I. I. Mechnikov.
- The Odesa I. I. Mechnikov National University operates in Odesa, Ukraine.
- The I.I. Mechnikov Institute of Microbiology and Immunology forms part of the National Academy of Medical Sciences of Ukraine.

== Personal life and views ==
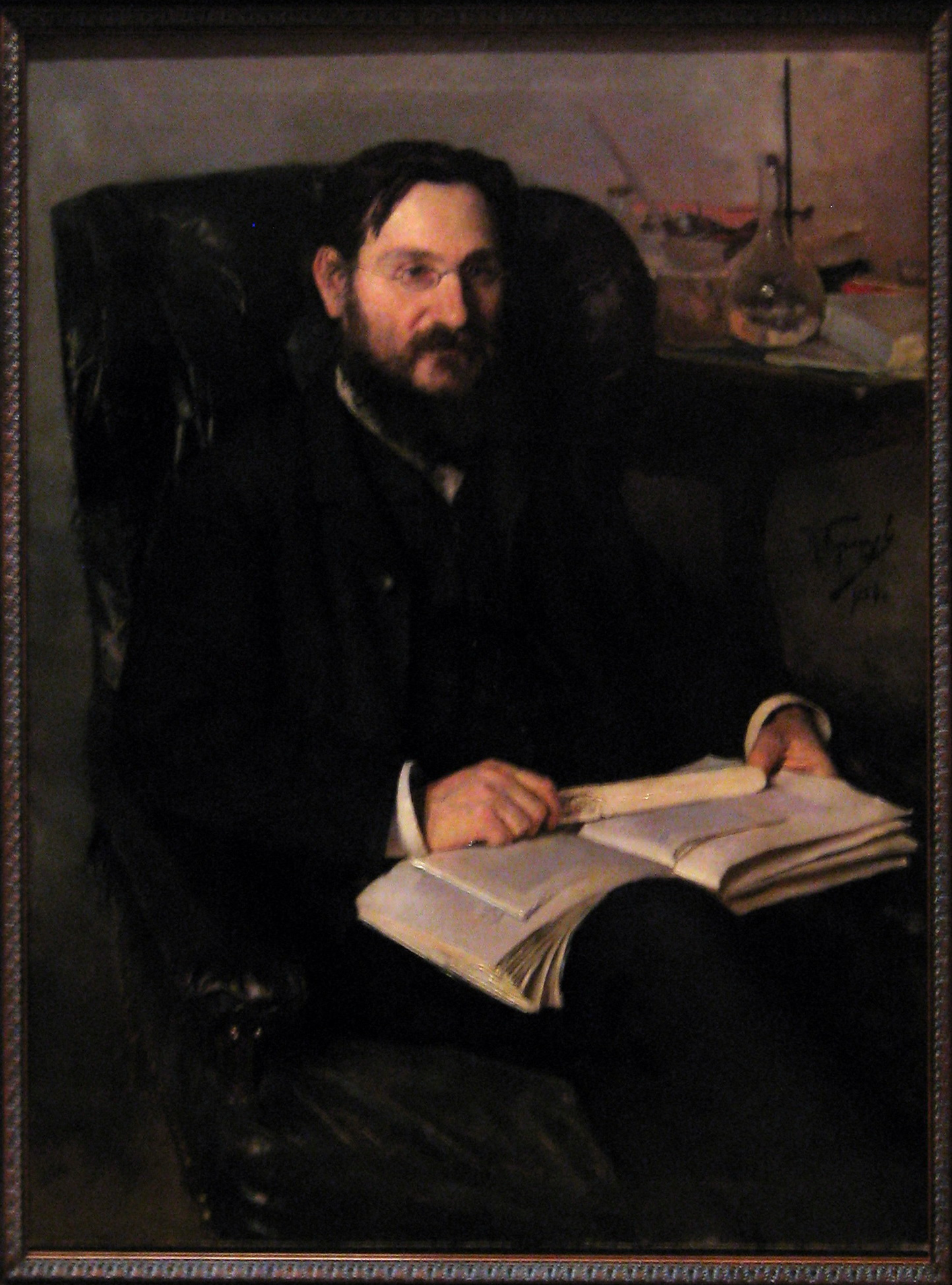
Nikolai Kuznetsov, Élie Metchnikoff, 1886

Metchnikoff married his first wife, Ludmila Feodorovitch, in 1869. She died from tuberculosis on 20 April 1873. Her death, combined with other problems, caused Metchnikoff to attempt suicide, taking a large dose of opium. In 1875, he married his student Olga Belokopytova. In 1880 Olga suffered from severe typhoid and this led to his second suicide attempt. He injected himself with the spirochete of relapsing fever. (Olga died in 1944 in Paris from typhoid.)

Despite being baptized in the Russian Orthodox Church, Metchnikoff was an atheist.

He was greatly influenced by Charles Darwin's theory of evolution. He first read Fritz Müller's Für Darwin (For Darwin) in Giessen. From this he became a supporter of natural selection and Ernst Haeckel's biogenetic law. His scientific works and theories were inspired by Darwinism, although he criticised Darwin for what he saw as his blind acceptance of the ideas of Thomas Malthus about overpopulation.

Metchnikoff died in 1916 in Paris from heart failure. According to his will, his body was used for medical research and afterwards cremated in Père Lachaise Cemetery crematorium. His cinerary urn has been placed in the Pasteur Institute library.

== Publications ==
Metchnikoff wrote notable books and papers, including:

- Leçons sur la pathologie comparée de l’inflammation (1892; Lectures on the Comparative Pathology of Inflammation)
- L’Immunité dans les maladies infectieuses (1901; Immunity in Infectious Diseases)
- Études sur la nature humaine (1903; The Nature of Man)
- Immunity in Infective Diseases (1905)
- The New Hygiene: Three Lectures on the Prevention of Infectious Diseases (1906)
- The Prolongation of Life: Optimistic Studies (1907)
- "Этюды оптимизма" [Etudes of Optimism]. Научного слова [Scientific Word] (2nd ed.). Moscow. 1909.
- "Этюды о природе человека" [Etudes About Human Nature]. Научного слова [Scientific Word] (4th ed.). Moscow. 1913 – via psychlib.ru.
- "Основатели современной медицины. Пастер — Листер — Кох" [The Founders of Modern Medicine: Pasteur - Lister - Koch]. Научного слова. Moscow. 1915 – via dlib.rsl.ru.

== See also ==
- List of Jewish Nobel laureates
- History of phagocytosis
