= Mechnikov =

Mechnikov (masculine, Russian: Мечников) or Mechnikova (feminine, Russian: Мечникова) is a Russian surname. Notable people with the surname include:

- Ilya Ilyich Mechnikov (1845–1916), Russian zoologist
  - I. I. Mechnikov Odessa National University
  - Mechnikov (crater), an impact crater on the far side of the Moon
- Lev Mechnikov (1838–1888), Russian anarchist and geographer

== See also ==
- Mechnikov Peak, a peak in Queen Maud Land, Antarctica
