= Draconematidae =

Scientific classification
- Kingdom: Animalia
- Phylum: Nematoda
- Class: Chromadorea
- Order: Desmodorida
- Family: Draconematidae

Synonyms
- Claparediellidae; Drepanonematidae; Prochaetosomatidae

Family of nematodes

Draconematidae is a family of nematodes belonging to the order Desmodorida.

Unlike many nematodes, they often use crawling rather than sinusoidal swimming, enabled by the complex body surface structures and often features scales, ridges, or spines, used for gliding through marine sediments.

Members of this family are distinctive for their elaborate and often highly ornamented cuticles, making them morphologically unique among nematodes.

== Genera ==
Genera:

- Apenodraconema Allen & Noffsinger, 1978
- Bathychaetosoma Decraemer, Gourbault & Backeljau, 1997
- Cephalochaetosoma Kito, 1983
- Dracograllus Allen & Noffsinger, 1978
