= Desmodorida =

Scientific classification
- Kingdom: Animalia
- Phylum: Nematoda
- Class: Chromadorea
- Subclass: Chromadoria
- Order: Desmodorida; De Coninck, 1965

Order of nematodes

Desmodorida is an order of nematodes belonging to the class Chromadorea.

Families:

- Ceramonematidae
- Choniolaimidae
- Chromadoridae
- Comesomatidae
- Cyatholaimidae
- Desmodoridae
- Draconematidae
- Epsilonematidae
- Etmolaimidae
- Microlaimidae
- Monoposthiidae
- Richtersiidae
- Selachinematidae
- Spiriniidae
- Xennellidae
