= Lev Mechnikov =

Russian geographer and anarchist

- Лев Мечников
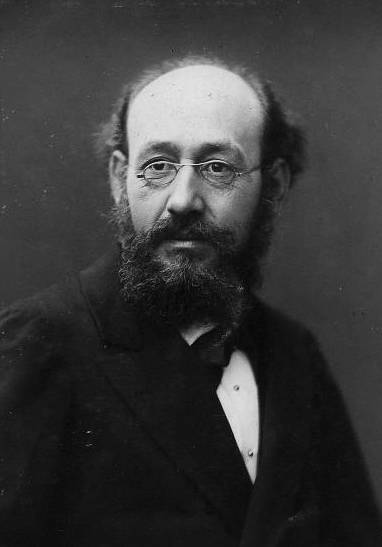
- Mechnikov (c. 1880)
- Born: 30 May 1838; Saint Petersburg, Russian Empire
- Died: 30 June 1888 (aged 50); Clarens, Montreux, Vaud, Switzerland
- Occupations: Geographer, sociologist
- Relatives: Élie Metchnikoff (brother)

Lev Ilyich Mechnikov (Russian: Лев Ильи́ч Ме́чников; French: Léon Metchnikoff; 30 May 1838 – 30 June 1888) was a Russian and Swiss geographer, sociologist and anarchist theorist.

== Biography ==
Lev Ilyich Mechnikov was born on 30 May [O.S. 18 May] 1838 in Saint Petersburg, the capital of the Russian Empire.

He enrolled at a number of different universities in Russia, where he studied various subjects including languages, medicine, physics and the arts. Due to his involvement in revolutionary activism, he was eventually suspended from attending lectures. In 1860, he moved to Italy, where he fought under Giuseppe Garibaldi during the Risorgimento. He was hurt during the Battle of the Volturno. In 1864, while living in Florence, he met the Russian revolutionaries Alexander Herzen and Mikhail Bakunin. That same year, he moved to Switzerland, where he lived and worked for 10 years.

In January 1874, he moved to Japan, where he worked as a teacher for two years, before returning to Switzerland. There he gave lectures about Japan at the University of Geneva and published a journal about East Asia, together with François Turrettini. He also collaborated with Elisée Reclus on his Nouvelle Géographie universelle, providing geographical information about Japan and Russia. In 1883, he began teaching statistics and comparative geography at the University of Neuchâtel, where he also founded Neuchâtel's local geographic society in 1885.

During this period, he wrote numerous works on sociology, geography and anarchist political theory. In his 1886 article Revolution and Evolution, he argued that sociocultural evolution tended inexorably from despotism to anarchy. In his sociology book Civilization and the Great Historical Rivers, posthumously published in 1889, he elaborated his thoughts on the origin and development of society: the lowest stage of civilisation involved the creation of public organisations through coercion; the transitionary stage involved the division of labour; and the highest stage was characterised by the formation of voluntary associations. He also depicted how civilisations developed through their connection with the hydrosphere, growing from river civilisations during ancient history, to mediterranean civilisations during the Middle Ages to oceanic civilisations during the modern period.

Mechnikov fell ill in 1887, which forced him to retire from teaching. He died on 30 June [O.S. 18 June] 1888 in Clarens, in the Swiss canton of Vaud.

== Selected works ==
Books

- L'Empire Japonais / The Japanese Empire (1881)
- La Civilisation et les grands fleuves historiques / Civilization and the Great Historical Rivers (1889)

Articles

- Revolution and Evolution (1886)

== Bibliography ==
- Enckell, Marianne (22 March 2014). "METCHNIKOFF Léon". Dictionnaire des anarchistes (in French). Paris: Le Maitron.
- Jud, Peter (11 May 2009). "Léon Metchnikoff". Historical Dictionary of Switzerland (in German).
- Zhereb, Alexandra (2019). "Mechnikov, Lev (1838–1888)". In Ritzer, G. (ed.). The Blackwell Encyclopedia of Sociology. pp. 1–2. doi:10.1002/9781405165518.wbeos1423. ISBN 9781405165518.
