= Pyotr Anokhin =

Russian biologist and physiologist

Pyotr Kuzmich Anokhin (Russian: Пётр Кузьми́ч Ано́хин; January 26, 1898 – March 5, 1974) was a Soviet and Russian biologist and physiologist, known for his theory of functional systems and the concept of systemogenesis. He made important contributions to cybernetics and psychophysiology. His pioneering concept on feedback was published in 1935.

== Overview ==
Anokhin was born in Tsaritsyn, Russian Empire in 1898. He studied neurophysiology and received a doctorate of medicine. He was an academician of Academy of Medical Sciences of the USSR and the Member of the Academy of Sciences of the USSR. He was one of the founders of the Institute of Psychology of the USSR and the laboratory of neuro-physiology of training.

In the 1920s he started his academic career under the guidance of Ivan Pavlov, Nobel Prize Winner in Physiology or Medicine in 1904. He developed the concept of feedback, published in 1935. Furthermore, he "elaborated the theory of functional systems (FS) which tied together subtle neuro-physiological mechanisms and integral activity of an individual. FS theory was considered as the “methodological bridge” between psychology and physiology". In the autumn of 1950, at a famous scientific session devoted to the problems of Pavlov's physiological teachings, new scientific trends were criticized and the theory of functional systems provoked serious rejection. Anokhin was suspended from work at the Institute of Physiology and sent to Ryazan.

Currently, his work is highly regarded in Russian and international psychophysiology. One of Moscow prospects and a Research Institute in Moscow was named after Anokhin. Several laboratories carry the names associated with his theory (such as the laboratory of functional systems in the Institute of Psychology, Russian Academy of Sciences.

He died in Moscow.

== Publications ==
The main works of Anokhin, P.K.:

- 1935, The problem of the center and periphery in the physiology of nervous activity, Gorky, 9-70.
- 1937, The functional system as the basis for the integration of nervous process during embryogenesis. All- Union Conference of Physiologists, Biochemists and Pharmacologists, Tbilisi (p. 148-156)
- 1940, The problem of localization from the point of view of systematic notions concerning nervous functions. J.Neoropath.exp.Neorol.,9, 31-44.
- 1945, Dreams and Science (Сновидения и наука), Moscow, Moscow Bolshevik, 40 p., (in Russian)
- 1949, The reflex and functional system as factor of physiological integration. Fiziol.Zh.(Moscow), 35, 491-503.
- 1958, International Inhibition as a Problem of Physiology, Moscow, Medgiz.
- 1961, A new conception of the physiological architecture by conditioned reflex. Brain Mechanisms and Learning, Oxford, Blackwell (pp. 189–229)
- 1963a, A methodological analysis of key problems in the conditioned reflex, Philosophical Problems of the Physiology of Higher Nervous Activity and of Psychology, Moscow, Academy of Sciences of USSR (p. 156-214)
- 1963b, Systemogenesis as a general regulator of brain development, Progress in Brain Research, Vol. 9, The Developing Brain, Amsterdam, Elsevier (pp. 54–86).
- 1968, The biology and neuro-physiology of conditioned reflex
- 1973, Biology and neurophysiology of the conditioned reflex and its role in adaptive behavior, Elsevier, 592 p.
- 1974, Biology and Neurophysiology of the Conditioned Reflex and Its Role in Adaptive Behavior. Oxford: Pergamon,1974
- 1975, The essays on physiology of functional systems
- 1977, P.K. Anokhin, Kira V. Shuleikina, System organization of alimentary behavior in the newborn and the developing cat, Developmental Psychology, 10(5)385-419(1977)
- 1978, Philosophical aspects of the theory of functional systems.
- 1998, Cybernetics of functional systems: Selected works (Кибернетика функциональных систем), Moscow, Medicine, 400 p., (in Russian)

== See also ==
- Biological cybernetics
- Systems biology
- Victor Glushkov
- Nikolai Bernstein
- Norbert Wiener
- List of neuroscientists
