= Epsilonematidae =

Scientific classification
- Domain: Eukaryota
- Kingdom: Animalia
- Phylum: Nematoda
- Class: Chromadorea
- Order: Desmodorida
- Family: Epsilonematidae

Family of worms

Epsilonematidae is a family of nematodes belonging to the order Desmodorida.

== Taxonomy ==
The following genera are recognised in the family Epsilonematidae:

- Akanthepsilonema Gourbault & Decraemer, 1991
- Archepsilonema Steiner, 1927
- Bathyepsilonema Steiner, 1927
- Epsilonella Steiner, 1931
- Epsilonema Steiner, 1927
- Epsilonoides Steiner, 1931
- Glochinema Lorenzen, 1974
- Keratonema Gourbault & Decraemer, 1986
- Leptepsilonema Clasing, 1983
- Metaglochinema Gourbault & Decraemer, 1986
- Metepsilonema Steiner, 1927
- Perepsilonema Lorenzen, 1973
- Polkepsilonema Verschelde & Vincx, 1993
- Pternepsilonema Verschelde & Vincx, 1993
- Rhabdogaster Metschnikoff, 1867
- Triepsilonema Decraemer, 1982
