= Comesomatidae =

Scientific classification
- Kingdom: Animalia
- Phylum: Nematoda
- Class: Chromadorea
- Order: Araeolaimida
- Family: Comesomatidae; Filipjev, 1918

Family of nematodes

Comesomatidae is a family of nematodes belonging to the order Araeolaimida.

== Genera ==
Genera:

- Asymmelaimus Tu, Thanh, Smol & Vanreusel, 2008
- Cervonema Wieser, 1954
- Comesoma Bastian, 1865
- Comesomoides Gourbault, 1980
- Dolichosomatum Allgén, 1951
- Dorylaimopsis Ditlevsen, 1918
- Expressonema Smolyanko & Belogurov, 1991
- Grahamia Allgén, 1959
- Grahamius Gerlach & Riemann, 1973
- Hopperia Vitiello, 1969
- Kenyanema Muthumbi, Soetaert & Vincx, 1997
- Laimella Cobb, 1920
- Metacomesoma Wieser, 1954
- Metasabatieria Timm, 1961
- Minolaimus Vitiello, 1970
- Notosabatieria Allgén, 1959
- Paracomesoma Hope & Murphy, 1972
- Paracomesoma Schuurmans Stekhoven, 1950
- Paramesonchium Hopper, 1967
- Pierrickia Vitiello, 1970
- Sabatieria Rouville, 1903
- Scholpanialla Sergeeva, 1972
- Scholpaniella Sergeeva, 1973
- Setosabatieria Platt, 1985
- Tridentellia
- Ungulilaimus Allgén, 1958
- Vasostoma Wieser, 1954
