= Stercutus (annelid) =

Scientific classification
- Kingdom: Animalia
- Phylum: Annelida
- Clade: Pleistoannelida
- Clade: Sedentaria
- Class: Clitellata
- Order: Enchytraeida
- Family: Enchytraeidae
- Genus: Stercutus; Michaelsen, 1888

Genus of annelid worms

Stercutus is a genus of annelids belonging to the family Enchytraeidae.

The species of this genus are found in Europe.

Species:

- Stercutus niveus Michaelsen, 1888
