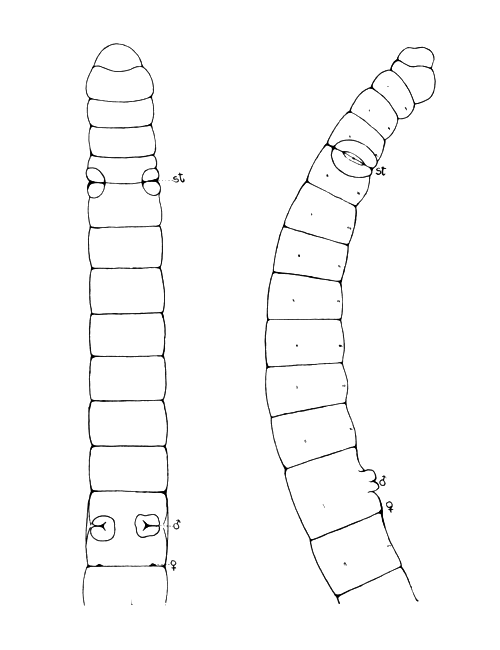

Scientific classification
- Kingdom: Animalia
- Phylum: Annelida
- Clade: Pleistoannelida
- Clade: Sedentaria
- Class: Clitellata
- Order: Enchytraeida
- Family: Enchytraeidae
- Genus: Mesenchytraeus
- Species: M. solifugus

Binomial name
- Mesenchytraeus solifugus (Emery, 1898)

= Mesenchytraeus solifugus =

Species of annelid worm

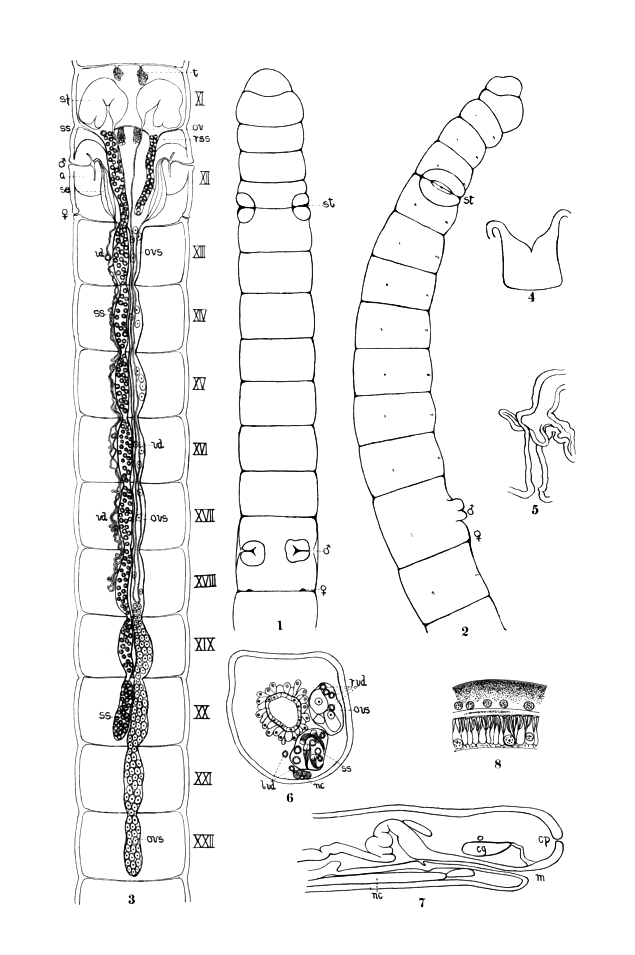

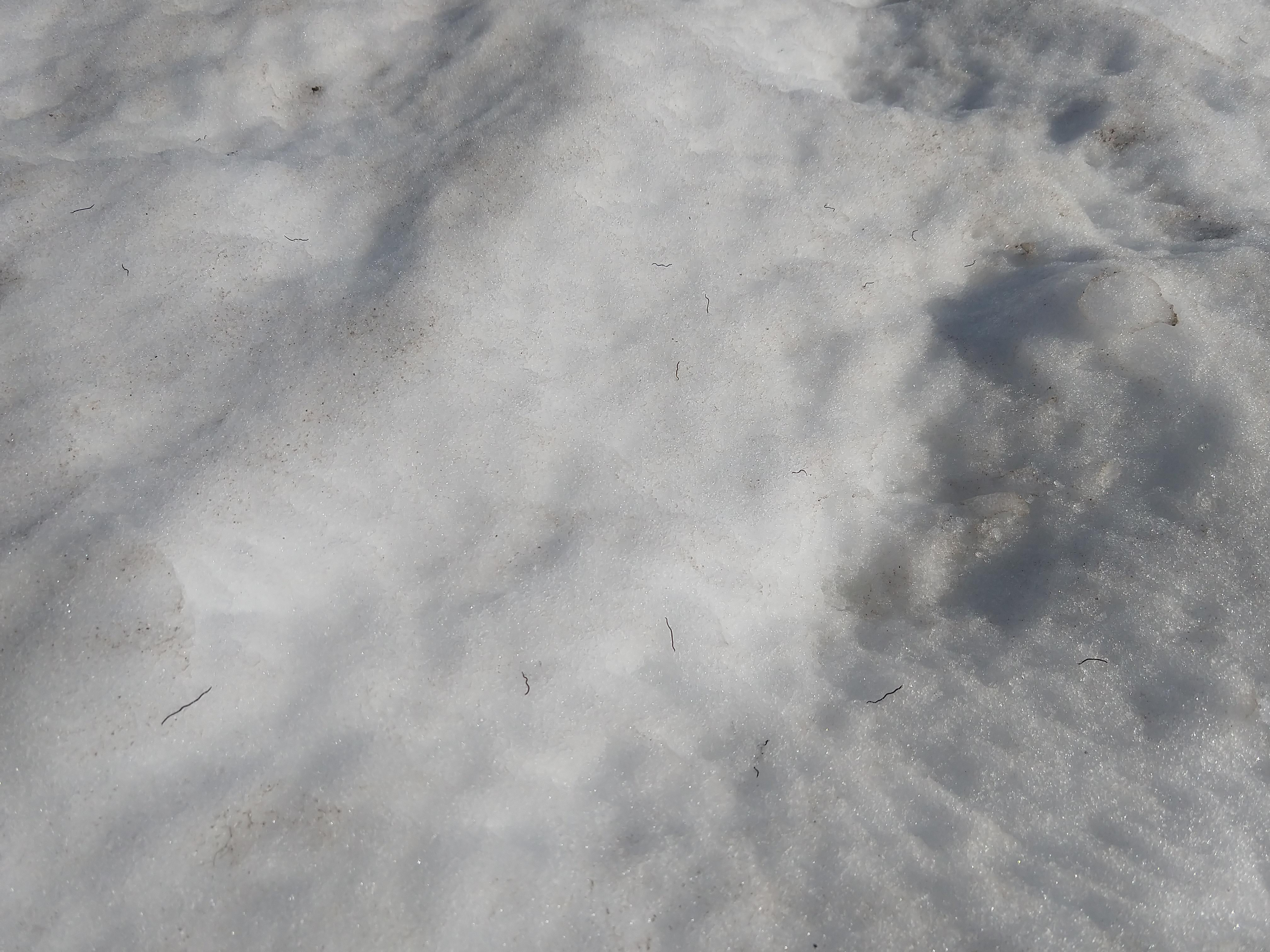
M. solifugus on Nisqually Glacier, Mount Rainier

Mesenchytraeus solifugus, commonly called an ice worm, is a species of oligochaete worm that inhabits coastal glaciers in northwestern North America. M. solifugus is dark brown and grows to about 15 mm long and 0.5 mm wide. It has a high population density and is common in suitable habitat. It can only survive at temperatures of approximately –7 °C to 5 °C. The ice worm is studied for its ability to survive in low temperatures. It has heavy pigment, absorbing most colors; however, it burrows into the glacier to avoid strong sunlight.

== History and taxonomy ==
This species was first reported from Muir Glacier in Alaska. Carlo Emery named it solifugus in 1898, meaning "fleeing from the sun". Phylogeny suggests that it evolved from an aquatic ancestor.

== Description ==
Ice worms are the only known psychrophilic annelids. Adult ice worms are approximately 1.5–2.5 centimeters (0.6–1.0 inch) long. They live their entire lives in snow or ice. The ice worm's dark pigmentation helps protect it from solar ultraviolet radiation. Their fluid and flexible bodies are able to squeeze through air holes and tiny crevasses in ice. Their lifespan is believed to be five to ten years.

Ice worms have an elongated head pore, with sensing organs located on their prostomium and ventral surface. These organs are responsible for chemo-, thermo, and photorecepetion. However, the worms lack eyes or eyespots. They have setae that curve at the tips, unlike those of related organisms.

Little is known about the life cycle of the ice worm; it is thought to be unusually slow. It requires temperatures of 0 °C for a successful reproduction. Cocoons are dispersed by birds. Little is known about the ice worm's diet, but it is thought to eat snow algae, as well as some bacteria.

== Habitat ==
Ice worms inhabit glaciers and can be found in snowfields, avalanche cones, and glacier rivers and pools. These environments have temperatures near the freezing point and are nutrient poor. The organisms require permanent glacial environments for survival and reproduction.

As well as the northwestern United States, ice worms have been found in glaciers of southern Alaska and certain parts of British Columbia. They can be abundant, with typical densities of about 100 per square meter and peak recorded densities of up to 6,000 per square meter. Though they are found in snowfields, rivers and pools, they are not found on dirty snow or rock.

== Ecology and behavior ==
M. solifugus have a very narrow acceptable temperature range. Their metabolisms have adapted to cold temperatures, and they are the only known worm to spend their entire life in temperatures near 0 C (32 °F), where they are most active and their ability to produce adenosine triphosphate (ATP) is at its peak. They freeze at around −6.8 °C (19.8 °F), and their bodies decompose after continuous exposure to temperatures above 5 °C (41 °F). This decomposition process, known as autolysis, occurs when the cells produce digestive enzymes and self-destruct. The body, figuratively, melts.

Even if other places are equally cold, ice worms never venture onto any other terrain. They eat the abundant snow algae and pollen carried by the wind.

Ice worms are most active in late spring. In the summer, they follow a diurnal cycle—at the first light in the morning, they sink into the glacier. A few hours before sunset, they poke out from the snow. In this respect they resemble some other oligochaetes that avoid strong radiation but are attracted to dim light.

Little is known about the ice worm during the winter as the inaccessibility of glaciers prevents further study. Since in the winter the surface temperature on a glacier can reach −40 °C (−40 °F), the worms most likely remain below the surface. They may burrow as deep as several feet into the glacier in search of an area with a favorable temperature. The snowfall provides insulation, and the temperatures below remains a stable 0 C (32 °F). Ice worms can still find plenty of algae in the firn layer, the layer of packed snow in transition to ice.

In glacial ponds or small streams, ice worms can be found in broad daylight. The freezing water provides the worms with a comfortable temperature, countering any heating of their dark bodies from the sun. In fast-flowing glacial streams, ice worms cling to the ice surface. Researchers have observed the worms gyrating their heads in the stream, possibly catching algae and pollen carried by the water. In still ponds, ice worms gather in bundles. Researchers speculate this is reproductive behavior. Ice worms do not graze in groups on the surface, so the contact in still ponds provides the rare opportunity for breeding.

Ice worms move on the surface of ice at about 3 m/h (meters per hour) and move through snow by squeezing between the grains. Lateral movement is usually along the surface of the glacier and they penetrate the glacier vertically.

== Research studies and medical uses ==
Researchers are investigating what prevents the worm from freezing at temperatures below 0 °C (32 °F) and are looking at the evolutionary steps by which the ice worm diverged from related species. Understanding the ice worm's physiology could suggest means by which to preserve organs for transplantation and could aid in the understanding of potential extraterrestrial life on cold planets, as well as species on Earth which survive in climates colder than previously thought possible.

== Sources ==
- Hartzell, P. (2003). Glacial Ecology: North Cascades Glacier Macroinvertebrates. Retrieved on Oct. 21, 2005, from: https://web.archive.org/web/20051212000121/http://nichols.edu/departments/Glacier/bio/index.htm
- Pelto, M. S. (2003). Ice Worms (Mesenchytraeus solifugus) and Their Habitats on North Cascade Glaciers. A study by North Cascade Glacier Climate Project. Retrieved on Sept. 28, 2005, from https://web.archive.org/web/20090209012557/http://www.nichols.edu/departments/glacier/iceworm.htm
- Shain, D. H., Carter M. R., Murray, K. P., Maleski, K. A., Smith, N. R., McBride, T. R., et al. (2000). Morphologic Characterization of the Ice Worm Mesenchytraeus solifugus. Journal of Morphology, 246, 192-197.
- Shain, D. H., Mason, T. A., Farrell, A. H., & Michalewicz, L. A. (2001). Distribution and behavior of ice worms (Mesenchytraeus solifugus) in south-central Alaska. Canadian Journal of Zoology, 79, 10, 1813-1821.
