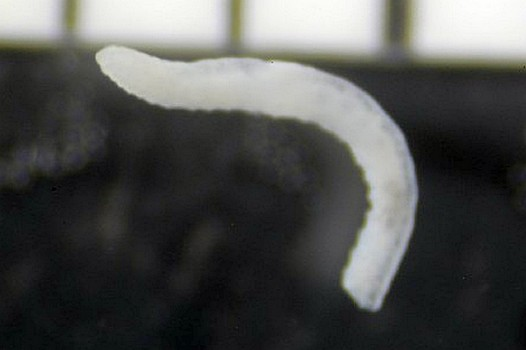
- Henlea perpusilla

Scientific classification
- Kingdom: Animalia
- Phylum: Annelida
- Clade: Pleistoannelida
- Clade: Sedentaria
- Class: Clitellata
- Order: Enchytraeida
- Family: Enchytraeidae
- Genus: Henlea; Michaelsen, 1889

= Henlea =

Genus of annelid worms

Henlea is a genus of annelids belonging to the family Enchytraeidae.

The genus has almost cosmopolitan distribution.

Species:

- Henlea adiverticulata Christensen & Dózsa-Farkas, 1999
- Henlea africana Bell, 1954
