= Achaeta eiseni =

Scientific classification
- Kingdom: Animalia
- Phylum: Annelida
- Clade: Pleistoannelida
- Clade: Sedentaria
- Class: Clitellata
- Order: Enchytraeida
- Family: Enchytraeidae
- Genus: Achaeta
- Species: A. eiseni

Binomial name
- Achaeta eiseni Vejdovský, 1878

Species of annelid worm

Achaeta eiseni is a species of annelids belonging to the family Enchytraeidae.

It is native to Europe.

It is named after Gustav Eisen.
