= Marionina =

Scientific classification
- Kingdom: Animalia
- Phylum: Annelida
- Clade: Pleistoannelida
- Clade: Sedentaria
- Class: Clitellata
- Order: Enchytraeida
- Family: Enchytraeidae
- Genus: Marionina; Michaelsen, 1890

Genus of annelids

Marionina is a genus of annelids belonging to the family Enchytraeidae.

The genus has cosmopolitan distribution.

Species:

- Marionina aberrans Finogenova, 1973
- Marionina achaeta (Hagen, 1954)
