= Grania (disambiguation) =

Grania is a genus of marine annelid worms.

Grania may also refer to:

- Gráinne, Irish mythical character
  - Grania, play by Lady Gregory
  - Grania: She-King of the Irish Seas, 2007 novel by Grace O'Malley
- Grania Davis (1943–2017), American author and editor of science fiction and fantasy novels and short stories
- Grania gens, plebeian family of ancient Rome
- Grania Langrishe (born 1934), Irish botanical illustrator and artist
- Grania Rubomboras, Ugandan electrical engineer
- Hope Nakazibwe Grania (born 1985), Ugandan politician

== See also ==
- Diarmuid and Grania, play
