= Hemifridericia =

Scientific classification
- Kingdom: Animalia
- Phylum: Annelida
- Clade: Pleistoannelida
- Clade: Sedentaria
- Class: Clitellata
- Order: Enchytraeida
- Family: Enchytraeidae
- Genus: Hemifridericia; Nielsen & Christensen, 1959

Genus of annelid worms

Hemifridericia is a genus of annelids belonging to the family Enchytraeidae.

The species of this genus are found in Eurasia and Northern America.

Species:

- Hemifridericia bivesiculata Christensen & Dózsa-Farkas, 2006
- Hemifridericia parva Nielsen & Christensen, 1959
