= Cognettia =

Scientific classification
- Kingdom: Animalia
- Phylum: Annelida
- Clade: Pleistoannelida
- Clade: Sedentaria
- Class: Clitellata
- Order: Enchytraeida
- Family: Enchytraeidae
- Genus: Cognettia; Nielsen & Christensen, 1959

Synonyms
- Chamaedrilus Friend, 1913

Genus of annelid worms

Cognettia is a genus of annelids belonging to the family Enchytraeidae.

The genus has almost cosmopolitan distribution.

Species:

- Cognettia alsoae (Martinsson, Klinth & Erséus, 2018)
- Cognettia baekrokdamensis (Dózsa-Farkas, Felföldi, Nagy & Hong, 2018)
