= Fridericia =

Fridericia may refer to:

- Fridericia (annelid), a genus of annelid worms in the family Enchytraeidae
- Fridericia (plant), a genus of plants in the family Bignoniaceae
