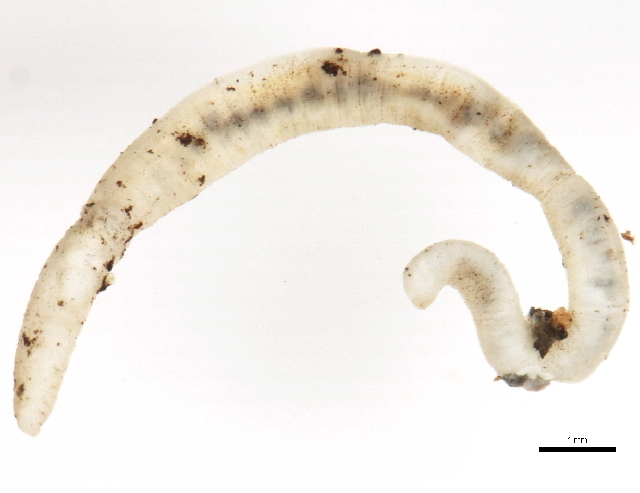
- Fridericia ratzeli

Scientific classification
- Kingdom: Animalia
- Phylum: Annelida
- Clade: Pleistoannelida
- Clade: Sedentaria
- Class: Clitellata
- Order: Enchytraeida
- Family: Enchytraeidae
- Genus: Fridericia; Michaelsen, 1889

= Fridericia (annelid) =

Genus of annelids

Fridericia is a genus of annelids of the family Enchytraeidae. The genus was described in 1889 by Wilhelm Michaelsen.
