= Buchholzia =

Buchholzia may refer to:

- Buchholzia (plant), a plant genus in the family Capparaceae
- Buchholzia (annelid), an animal genus in the family Enchytraeidae
