= Cernosvitoviella =

Scientific classification
- Kingdom: Animalia
- Phylum: Annelida
- Clade: Pleistoannelida
- Clade: Sedentaria
- Class: Clitellata
- Order: Enchytraeida
- Family: Enchytraeidae
- Genus: Cernosvitoviella; Nielsen & Christensen, 1959

Genus of annelid worms

Cernosvitoviella is a genus of annelids belonging to the family Enchytraeidae.

The genus was first described by Nielsen and Christensen in 1959.

The species of this genus are found in Eurasia and Northern America.

Species:

- Cernosvitoviella crassoductus
- Cernosvitoviella immota
- Cernosvitoviella tatrensis
