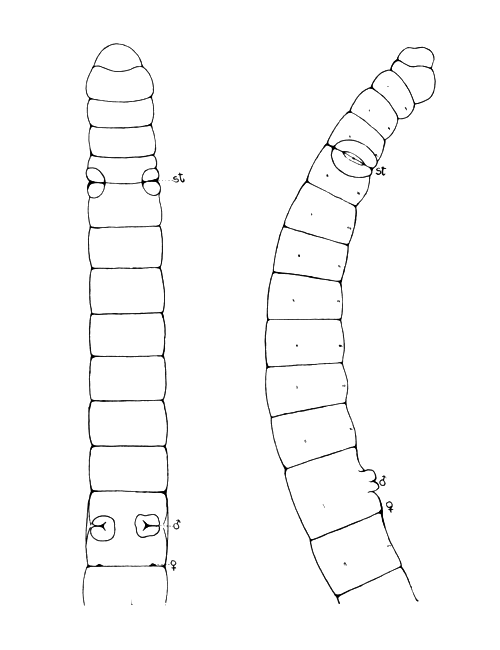
- Mesenchytraeus solifugus

Scientific classification
- Kingdom: Animalia
- Phylum: Annelida
- Clade: Pleistoannelida
- Clade: Sedentaria
- Class: Clitellata
- Order: Enchytraeida
- Family: Enchytraeidae
- Genus: Mesenchytraeus; Eisen, 1878

Type species
- Mesenchytraeus primaevus Eisen, 1878

Species
- See text

= Ice worm =

Genus of annelid worms

Ice worms (also written as ice-worms or iceworms, or also called glacial or glacier worms) are enchytraeid annelids of the genus Mesenchytraeus. The majority of the species in the genus are abundant in gravel beds or the banks of riverine habitats, but the best-known members of the genus are found in glacial ice. They include the only annelid worms known to spend their entire lives in glacial ice, and some of the few metazoans to complete their entire life cycle at conditions below 0 °C (32 °F).

They were discovered in a wide range of environments, which include level snowfields, steep avalanche cones, crevasse walls, glacial rivers and pools, and hard glacier ice. These organisms are unique in that they can simply move between tightly packed ice crystals. They use setae, which are small bristles found on the outside of their bodies, to grip the ice and pull themselves along.

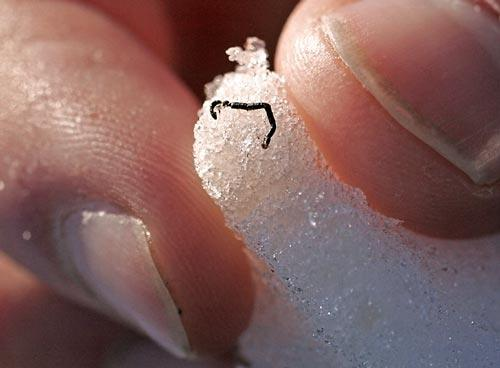
Unknown species of ice worm

The genus contains 77 species, including the North American glacier ice worm and the Yosemite snow worm.

Ice worms eat snow algae and bacteria. The specimens researched by Scott Hotaling, researcher at Washington State University, live at 0 °C (32 °F) and die if temperatures dip even slightly below that.

== History ==
In North America, the first ice worms species were discovered in 1887 in Alaska, on the Muir Glacier. These glacier ice worms can be found on glaciers in Alaska, Washington, Oregon, and British Columbia. They have not been found in other glaciated regions of the world.

== Description ==
The specific name solifugus for the North American species, Mesenchytraeus solifugus, is Latin for "sun-avoiding", as ice worms retreat underneath the ice before dawn. Enzymes in ice worms have very low optimal temperatures, and can be denatured at even a few degrees above 0 °C (32 °F). When ice worms are exposed to temperatures as modest as 5 °C (41 °F), their membrane structures disassociate and fall apart (i.e., "melt") causing the worm itself to "liquefy". Ice worms are several centimeters long, and can be black, blue, or white. They come to the surface of the glaciers in the evening and morning. On Suiattle Glacier in the North Cascades, population counts indicated over 7 billion ice worms.

It is not known how ice worms tunnel through the ice. Some scientists believe they travel through microscopic fissures in ice sheets, while others believe they secrete some chemical which can melt ice by lowering its freezing point, like an antifreeze. They feed on snow algae.

== Species ==
The genus contains 77 species. They are the following:

- Mesenchytraeus affinis Michaelsen, 1901
- Mesenchytraeus altus Welch, 1917
- Mesenchytraeus americanus Bell, 1942
- Mesenchytraeus anisodiverticulus Shen, Chen & Xie, 2012
- Mesenchytraeus antaeus Rota & Brinkhurst, 2000
- Mesenchytraeus arcticus Bell, 1962
- Mesenchytraeus argentatus Nurminen, 1973b
- Mesenchytraeus armatus (Levinsen, 1884)

- Mesenchytraeus armatus armatus (Levinsen, 1884)
- Mesenchytraeus armatus kananaskis Dash, 1970

- Mesenchytraeus asiaticus Eisen, 1904
- Mesenchytraeus atriaphorus Altman, 1936
- Mesenchytraeus beringensis Eisen, 1904
- Mesenchytraeus beumeri (Michaelsen, 1886b)
- Mesenchytraeus bungei Michaelsen, 1901
- Mesenchytraeus cejkai Cernosvitov, 1937d
- Mesenchytraeus celticus Southern, 1909
- Mesenchytraeus chaunus Piper, MacLean & Christensen, 1982
- Mesenchytraeus chromophorus Altman, 1936
- Mesenchytraeus crenobius Timm, 1994
- Mesenchytraeus diplobulbosus Bell, 1949
- Mesenchytraeus diverticulatus Piper, MacLean & Christensen, 1982
- Mesenchytraeus eastwoodi Eisen, 1904
- Mesenchytraeus eltoni Stephenson, 1925
- Mesenchytraeus falciformis Eisen, 1878
- Mesenchytraeus flavidus Michaelsen, 1887
- Mesenchytraeus flavus (Levinsen, 1884)
- Mesenchytraeus fontinalis Eisen, 1904

- Mesenchytraeus fontinalis fontinalis Eisen, 1904
- Mesenchytraeus fontinalis gracilis Eisen, 1904

- Mesenchytraeus franciscanus Eisen, 1904
- Mesenchytraeus fuscus Eisen, 1904

- Mesenchytraeus fuscus fuscus Eisen, 1904
- Mesenchytraeus fuscus inermis Eisen, 1904

- Mesenchytraeus gaudens Cognetti, 1903a
- Mesenchytraeus gelidus Welch, 1916
- Mesenchytraeus gigachaetus Xie, 2012
- Mesenchytraeus glandulosus (Levinsen, 1884)
- Mesenchytraeus grandis Eisen, 1904
- Mesenchytraeus grebnitzkyi Michaelsen, 1901
- Mesenchytraeus groenlandicus Nielsen & Christensen, 1959
- Mesenchytraeus hamiltoni Healy, 1996b
- Mesenchytraeus harrimani Eisen, 1904
- Mesenchytraeus hydrius Welch, 1919a
- Mesenchytraeus johanseni Welch, 1919b
- Mesenchytraeus kincaidi Eisen, 1904
- Mesenchytraeus kontrimavichusi Piper, MacLean & Christensen, 1982
- Mesenchytraeus konyamensis Michaelsen, 1916
- Mesenchytraeus kuehnelti Dózsa-Farkas, 1991a
- Mesenchytraeus kuril Healy & Timm, 2000
- Mesenchytraeus lusitanicus Collado, Martínez-Ansemil, and Giani, 1993
- Mesenchytraeus macnabi Bell, 1942
- Mesenchytraeus maculatus Eisen, 1904
- Mesenchytraeus magnus Altman, 1936
- Mesenchytraeus melanocephalus Christensen & Dózsa-Farkas, 1999
- Mesenchytraeus minimus Altman, 1936
- Mesenchytraeus mirabilis Eisen, 1878
- Mesenchytraeus monochaetus Bretscher, 1900
- Mesenchytraeus monodiverticulus Shen, Chen & Xie, 2012
- Mesenchytraeus monothecatus Bell, 1945
- Mesenchytraeus multispinus (Grube, 1851)
- Mesenchytraeus nanus Eisen, 1904
- Mesenchytraeus obscurus Eisen, 1904
- Mesenchytraeus ogloblini Černosvitov, 1928b
- Mesenchytraeus orcae Eisen, 1904
- Mesenchytraeus pedatus Eisen, 1904
- Mesenchytraeus pelicensis Issel, 1905c
- Mesenchytraeus penicillus Eisen, 1904
- Mesenchytraeus primaevus Eisen, 1878
- Mesenchytraeus rhithralis Healy & Fend, 2002
- Mesenchytraeus sanguineus Nielsen & Christensen, 1959
- Mesenchytraeus setchelli Eisen, 1904
- Mesenchytraeus solifugus (Emery, 1898)

- Mesenchytraeus solifugus solifugus (Emery, 1898)
- Mesenchytraeus solifugus rainierensis Welch, 1916

- Mesenchytraeus straminicolus Rota, 1995
- Mesenchytraeus sveni Christensen & Dózsa-Farkas, 1999
- Mesenchytraeus svetae Piper, MacLean & Christensen, 1982
- Mesenchytraeus tetrapodus Timm, 1978
- Mesenchytraeus torbeni Christensen & Dózsa-Farkas, 1999
- Mesenchytraeus tundrus Piper, MacLean & Christensen, 1982
- Mesenchytraeus unalaskae Eisen, 1904
- Mesenchytraeus variabilis Cejka, 1914
- Mesenchytraeus vegae Eisen, 1904
- Mesenchytraeus viivi Timm, 1978
- Mesenchytraeus vshivkovae Timm, 1994

Mesenchytraeus franzi is a junior synonym of Cognettia clarae. Mesenchytraeus megachaetae Shen, Chen & Xie, 2011 has been renamed Mesenchytraeus gigachaetus Xie, 2012 due to the previous name being preoccupied by Mesenchytraeus megachaetae Bretscher, 1901, a junior synonym of Mesenchytraeus armatus.
