= Volcom =

Lifestyle brand

Volcom, LLC
- Type: Subsidiary
- Industry: Textile
- Founded: 1991; 35 years ago, in Orange County, California, U.S.
- Founder: Richard Woolcott; Tucker Hall
- Defunct: April 25, 2025; 16 months ago
- Fate: Chapter 11 bankruptcy; Liquidation; (U.S. Operations Only)
- Headquarters: Costa Mesa, California, U.S.
- Number of locations: 38 (April 2025)
- Area served: Worldwide
- Key people: List: Richard "Wooly" Woolcott (founder, executive chairman) Brad Holman (CFO) Todd Hymel (CEO) Ryan Immegart, SVP Global Marketing Mike Aho, Creative Director
- Number of employees: 1400 (February 06, 2025)
- Parent: Authentic Brands Group
- Divisions: Veeco Productions
- Subsidiaries: Volcom Entertainment, Inc. Volcom logoOwnerElvusOmaresRetail, Inc.
- Website: volcom.com

Volcom is an American lifestyle brand that designed, marketed, and distributed boardsports-oriented products. Volcom is headquartered in Costa Mesa, California. The brand was known for its trademark stone logo, its slogan True to This, and the Let the Kids Ride Free campaign. Todd Hymel is the CEO of Volcom.

== History ==
=== 1991–1995: Origins ===
Volcom was founded in 1991 by Richard "Wooly" Woolcott and Tucker "T-Dawg" Hall, who based the ethos of the company on their own experiences with boardsports. In March 1991, the two friends went on a snowboarding trip to Tahoe, U.S., and afterward, they decided to start a clothing company.

Chet Thomas was the first professional skateboarder to be sponsored by the brand. In 1995, Volcom was the first action sports company to create a record label, Volcom Entertainment.

=== 1995–2011: IPO, Kering and ABG acquisitions ===
In April 2005, the company adopted its current name, "Volcom, Inc." Volcom became a publicly traded entity on June 29, 2005, when Wachovia Securities, D.A. Davidson and Piper Jaffray underwrote an initial public offering on NASDAQ. They priced 4.69 million shares at US$19 a share, raising a total of US$89 million.

In early 2008, Volcom made its first acquisition, taking ownership of Electric Visual Evolution LLC for US$25.3 million. In early 2016, Eric Crane acquired the brand from Volcom for an undisclosed amount.

On May 2, 2011, PPR (turned Kering in 2013) launched a friendly takeover offer to buy Volcom Inc. for US$24.50 a share, valuing the company at US$608 million. Volcom's board unanimously backed the PPR offer, and shareholders were advised to tender their shares to the French company.

Since the takeover, Kering has sought to expand and diversify the Volcom brand. The support from Kering allowed Volcom to launch its first ever closed-toe footwear line in July 2013.

On April 3, 2019, Authentic Brands Group had announced it acquired Volcom from Kering.

== Retail ==
Volcom's first retail store was opened on November 23, 2002, in Los Angeles. Since then, seven more Volcom stores have opened in the United States, and six more in Canada.

Outside America, Volcom has numerous international retail stores including locations in Barcelona, Spain; Hossegor, Bordeaux, and Paris, France; two locations in Bali, Indonesia; Tokyo, Japan; Durban and Pretoria, South Africa; Bangkok, Thailand; London and Falmouth, England; Melbourne, Australia; Buenos Aires, Argentina; Santiago, Chile; Lima, Perú; São Paulo, Brazil; Isla de Margarita, Venezuela; Lisbon, Portugal; Stuttgart, Germany; Davos, Switzerland, Calgary, Edmonton, Vancouver, Winnipeg, and Fort McMurray, Canada, Costa Rica; Amsterdam, the Netherlands; and Guam.

On February 2, 2025, Liberated Brands, owner of Volcom retail stores in the US, filed for Chapter 11 bankruptcy protection, listing assets and liabilities between $100 million and $500 million. The company announced the closure of all remaining Volcom locations in the US, with liquidation sales beginning a week before the bankruptcy.

== Teams ==
=== Surfing ===
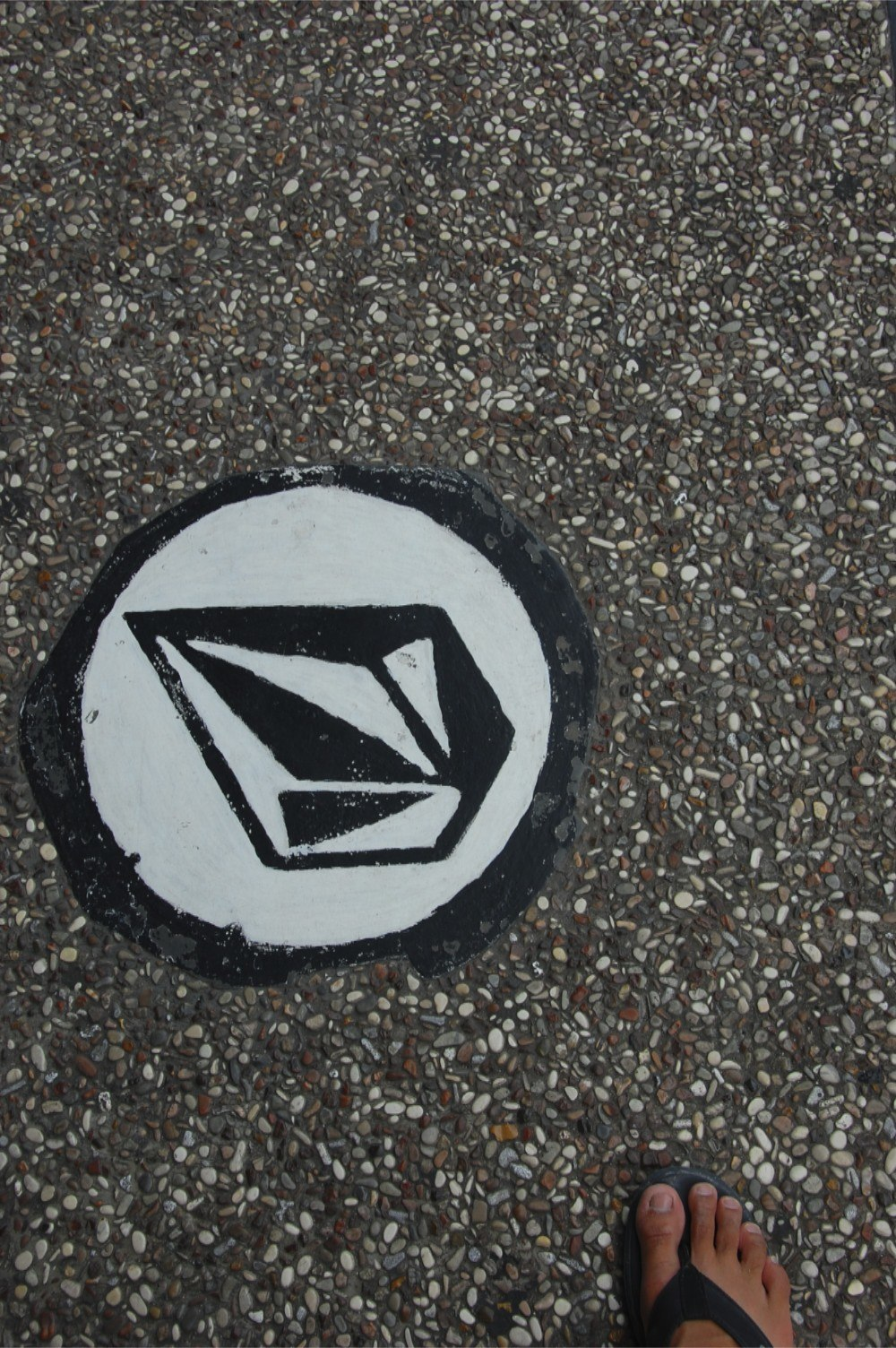
Street art featuring the Volcom logo.

- Laura Coviella
- Noa Deane
- Dusty Payne
- Balaram Stack
- Mitch Coleborn
- Gony Zubizarreta
- Parker Coffin
- Andrew Doheny
- Ozzy Wright
- Nate Tyler
- Ryan Burch
- Gavin Beschen
- Alison Lindsey
- Kobi Clements
- Joan Duru
- Maud Le Car
- Coco Ho
- Jack Robinson

=== Skateboarding ===
- Pedro Barros
- Alec Majerus
- Rune Glifberg
- Dustin Dollin
- Caswell Berry
- Daan Van Der Linden
- Colin Provost
- Grant Taylor
- Dane Burman
- Ana Studley
- Jackson Pilz
- Axel Cruysberghs
- Omar Hassan
- Sky Brown
- Victor Cortez
- CJ Collins
- Chima Ferguson
- Chris Pfanner
- Simon Bannerot
- Milton Martinez
- Rachelle Vinberg
- David Gravette
- Stella Reynolds
- Jiro Platt

=== Snowboarding ===
- Ryan Immegart (Volcom's first sponsored snowboarder)
- Pat Moore
- Bryan Iguchi
- Jeff "Jonesy" Anderson
- Curtis Ciszek
- Dylan Alito
- Elena Hight
- Hailey Langland
- Jamie Lynn
- Markus Keller
- Mike Ravelson
- Scott Blum
- Arthur Longo
- Terje Haakonsen
- Torgeir Bergrem
- Marcus Kleveland
- Reid Smith
- Scotty James

== Volcomunity ==
Volcomunity is an online space for Volcom ambassadors—singers, models, and designers to blog about their lives. Natalie Suarez, Jennifer Herrema, Billie Edwards, Elle Green, Mike Correia, Stephanie Cherry, Amy Smith, Zoe Grisedale-Sherry and Hannah Logic are Volcom ambassadors.

In 2012, Volcom collaborated with Volcom ambassadors POSSO for the second time. POSSO is described by the brand as "2 best friends from Northern California with a love for art, design, fashion, and music." The collection included dresses and a bikini outfit.

== Events ==
=== 2013 Volcom Pipe Pro Event ===
The 2013 Volcom Pipe Pro surf competition that took place between January 27 and February 7, 2013, has been designated as a Deep Blue Surfing Event as it completed the ASP (Association of Surfing Professionals) Green Guidelines Recommendations. The event strove to reduce the environmental impacts of a professional surfing contest and to provide social benefits for the local community.

=== 2014 Volcom Pipe Pro Event ===
The 2014 Volcom Pipe Pro surf competition took place between January 26 and February 7, 2014, at the Banzai Pipeline with waves at 8–12 feet, and was televised on Saturday, June 7, 2014, on NBC. The competition is an ASP, WQS (World Qualifying Series) 5-Star Event with a $130,000 prize purse, and once again has been designated as a Deep Blue Surfing Event, working with Sustainable Surf, a waste diversion company.

== Philanthropy ==
Volcom created the "V.Co-logical Series" collection, whereby one percent of sales are donated to environmentally focused non-profit organizations. The company is a member of the "1% for the Planet" initiative.

In 2011, Volcom collaborated with Krochet Kids International, an organization that seeks to reduce poverty. Volcom sold handmade clothes from Uganda and some of the revenue was donated to Krochet Kids International.

== Awards ==
In 2003, Woolcott was named the Surf Industry Manufacturers Association Individual Achiever of the Year. In 2004, Woolcott was inducted into the National Scholastic Surfing Association Hall of Fame.

In 2010, Volcom won the TransWorld Business Industry and Retail Award: "Brand of the Year". Also in 2010, Woolcott was nominated for the Entrepreneur of the Year Award at Chapman University by the Leatherby Entrepreneurship Center.
