= Propappus =

Scientific classification
- Kingdom: Animalia
- Phylum: Annelida
- Clade: Pleistoannelida
- Clade: Sedentaria
- Class: Clitellata
- Order: Enchytraeida
- Family: Propappidae
- Genus: Propappus; Michaelsen, 1905

Genus of annelid worms

Propappus is a genus of annelids belonging to the monotypic family Propappidae.

Species:

- Propappus arhyncotus Sokolskaja, 1972
- Propappus glandulosus Michaelsen, 1905
- Propappus volki Michaelsen, 1916
