= Mesenchytraeus harrimani =

Scientific classification
- Kingdom: Animalia
- Phylum: Annelida
- Clade: Pleistoannelida
- Clade: Sedentaria
- Class: Clitellata
- Order: Tubificida
- Family: Enchytraeidae
- Genus: Mesenchytraeus
- Species: M. harrimani

Binomial name
- Mesenchytraeus harrimani Eisen, 1904

Species of annelid

Mesenchytraeus harrimani is an ice worm, named after E. H. Harriman. The worm was first discovered by an insect trapper on board Harriman's famous Arctic expedition, and was given the name by the entomologist Trevor Kincaid. The worm can grow to almost 60 millimetres (2.4 in) in length and 2.5 mm (0.098 in) thick. Like other ice worms, it subsists on algae and pollen.
