= Stephensoniella =

Stephensoniella may refer to:

- Stephensoniella (plant) - a liverwort (Marchantiophyta)
- Stephensoniella (annelid) - a genus of annelid worm
