= Enchytronia =

Scientific classification
- Kingdom: Animalia
- Phylum: Annelida
- Clade: Pleistoannelida
- Clade: Sedentaria
- Class: Clitellata
- Order: Enchytraeida
- Family: Enchytraeidae
- Genus: Enchytronia; Nielsen & Christensen, 1959

Genus of annelids

Enchytronia is a genus of annelids belonging to the family Enchytraeidae.

The species of this genus are found in Europe.

Species:

- Enchytronia annulata Nielsen & Christensen, 1959
- Enchytronia baloghi Dózsa-Farkas, 1988
