= Buchholzia (annelid) =

Scientific classification
- Kingdom: Animalia
- Phylum: Annelida
- Clade: Pleistoannelida
- Clade: Sedentaria
- Class: Clitellata
- Order: Enchytraeida
- Family: Enchytraeidae
- Genus: Buchholzia; Michaelsen, 1886

Extant species
- Buchholzia appendiculata; Buchholzia fallax

Genus of annelids

Buchholzia is a genus of annelids belonging to the family Enchytraeidae.

The genus was first described by Michaelsen in 1886.

Species:

- Buchholzia appendiculata
- Buchholzia fallax
