= 2006 Mammoth Mountain Ski Patrol deaths =

Disaster in California, United States

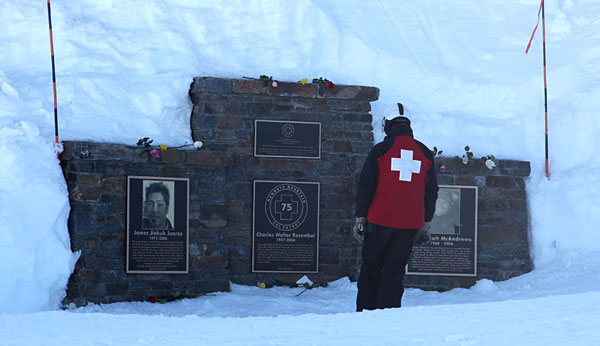
- Date: April 6, 2006
- Time: 11:29 a.m. (Pacific Time Zone)
- Location: Mammoth Mountain Ski Area
- Cause: Toxic gas exposure from volcanic fumarole
- Deaths: Charles Walter Rosenthal, James Juarez, and John Scott McAndrews

On April 6, 2006, three members of the Mammoth Mountain ski patrol team died after falling into a volcanic fumarole near the summit during safety operations. The incident occurred while patrollers were securing a snow-covered geothermal vent following record snowfall. This event highlighted the risks associated with volcanic gases in the area and prompted investigations into safety protocols, as well as memorial efforts to honor the victims.

== Background ==
Mammoth Mountain, located in California's Sierra Nevada range, is an active stratovolcano and a popular destination for skiing and other recreational activities. Volcanic activity in the region gives rise to fumaroles, which are natural vents that emit gases such as carbon dioxide, Nitrogen, and hydrogen sulfide. These gases can accumulate in snow-covered depressions, creating an asphyxiation risk.

The fumaroles in the area had been a known hazard for years. A similar incident occurred in 1995 when a skier fell into a fumarole at Lassen Volcanic National Park and died from inhaling toxic gases. A 1998 incident at nearby Horseshoe Lake also involved a cross-country skier who died from carbon dioxide poisoning after inhaling gas from one of the fumaroles.

Officials said severe winter storms with a record amount of snow on the mountain contributed to the incident. There had been a record 52 feet of snow. Before this incident, five people had died on or near Mammoth during that year alone.

== Incident ==
On Thursday, April 6, 2006, four Mammoth ski patrollers were working to secure a geothermal vent on Christmas Bowl run (east of Chair 3, now Face Lift Express). Ski patrol had worked around the vents for years. The area had been closed due to heavy snowfall earlier that day. The ski patrol had been digging out fencing that had been buried around the fumarole to prevent skiers from accessing the hazardous vent, which was small but deep. According to Mammoth Lakes mayor Rick Wood, the vent was about 12 feet wide and 22 feet deep. He told the LA Times: "The gas levels were very high. When the patrollers first went to fence it off, there was a lot of snow, but the opening was quite small."

The snow above the fumarole gave way, causing two of the patrollers, James Juarez and John "Scotty" McAndrews, to fall into the vent. It was initially reported that the two men called for help for a few minutes, however it is more likely that they were overcome by toxic gases immediately. Charles Walter Rosenthal, the first rescuer to enter the fumarole, carried a small bottle of oxygen for the fallen patrollers but none for himself. He quickly succumbed to the fumes and died. Jeff Bridges, a second rescuer, then donned an oxygen mask and entered to help, but was also overcome by the toxic gases. A third rescuer, Steve McCombs, used a rope to enter, pulled Bridges to safety, and managed to escape the fumes. Bridges was treated at Mammoth Lakes Hospital for oxygen deprivation and lung irritation. Rosenthal died while attempting the rescue.

The bodies of the fallen patrollers were recovered, and seven other patrollers—six of whom had responded to the accident—were taken to Mammoth Hospital for treatment of injuries. The Mono County Coroner determined that the three men died of asphyxiation from the volcanic gases.

== Victims ==
=== Charles Walter Rosenthal ===
Charles Walter Rosenthal, 58, was a scientist and member of the Mammoth Ski Patrol. He grew up in Los Angeles and attended Burbank High School (Burbank, California) and University of California, Los Angeles. He held a master's degree in snow hydrology from the University of California, Santa Barbara, and worked as a researcher for the Institute for Computational Earth System Science and as a teaching at UCSB. He published articles on remote sensing of snow and avalanche forecasting methods and worked for the US Army Corps of Engineers Cold Regions Research and Engineering Laboratory in the summers. On the ski patrol, he served as the Snow and Avalanche Analyst and president of the Eastern Sierra Avalanche Center, which he helped to establish. He was known for his first ascents in Yosemite Valley and first ski descents in the High Sierra. He began working at Mammoth Mountain in 1972–73 and joined the ski patrol in the 1981–82 season.

Rosenthal was posthumously recognized by the Carnegie Hero Fund for his actions.

=== Scotty McAndrews ===
John Scott McAndrews, 37, known as "Scotty", joined the Mammoth Mountain Ski Patrol in late 2005. A lifelong outdoors enthusiast from Scranton, Pennsylvania, McAndrews had previously worked for Outward Bound as an outdoor educator after earning his degree from Penn State University in 1991. Although he earned a master's degree in Special Education, McAndrews was drawn to ski patrol work. His peers recognized him as "Rookie of the Year," an award he received just two days before his death. Scholarship and legacy funds were created in his memory.

=== James Juarez ===
James Juarez, 35, was a member of the ski patrol since 2002. Originally from Granada Hills, California, he graduated from John F. Kennedy High School (Los Angeles) in 1989 and joined the United States Marine Corps. He attended Los Angeles Pierce College and finished his education at a community college in San Diego. He had a background in both ski patrolling and lifeguarding, including at Solana Beach, California. He suffered a serious back injury while working on ski runs that took him a year to recover from. In addition to his work as a ski patroller, Juarez enjoyed surfing, leather work, and cooking.

== Response and aftermath ==
The aftermath of the incident raised questions regarding whether the geothermal vent should have been labeled a hazardous "confined space," which would have necessitated different safety protocols. Confined spaces, as defined by the Occupational Safety and Health Administration (OSHA), are areas that pose specific dangers such as limited entry or exit points, poor ventilation, or the presence of hazardous materials like toxic gases. Had the fumarole been designated a confined space, the ski patrol workers would have been required to use breathing equipment and to be tethered with a rope for safety. This would have ensured that rescuers could have been pulled to safety in case of emergency.

In the immediate wake of the incident, a Cal/OSHA spokesperson said: "This is not the first time we've been at this site. The first time was in 1995, when we were looking at this exact area and helping the ski area understand why it needs to be avoided. The hazards of this location are well-known."

=== Cal/OSHA investigation and lawsuit ===
Cal/OSHA's investigation found that Mammoth Mountain Ski Area failed to properly assess hazards, provide training, and implement safety measures. The resort was fined $50,000 for multiple violations, including lack of hazard evaluation, improper training, and missing warning signs. Additionally, the resort received general citations for not conducting atmosphere tests or providing proper safety equipment. Mammoth Mountain intended to appeal the citations.

Two families filed a civil lawsuit against the federal government in connection to the incident.

=== Memorials ===
Days after the accident, a memorial was held on the mountain. In 2007, Mammoth Mountain dedicated a stone monument at the summit in memory of the three men. Designed by Larry Walker, the memorial was placed at a summit location. The site was chosen for its inspiring view and year-round accessibility.

In 2016, hundreds attended a memorial service that marked the 10th anniversary of the accident.
