= Snow hydrology =

Field of snow science concerning its composition and dispersion

Snow hydrology is a scientific study in the field of hydrology which focuses on the composition, dispersion, and movement of snow and ice. Studies of snow hydrology predate the Anno Domini era, although major breakthroughs were not made until the mid eighteenth century.

Snowfall, accumulation and melt are important hydrological processes in watersheds at high altitudes or latitudes. In many western states in the United States, snow melt accounts for a large percentage of the spring runoff that serves as water supply to reservoirs, urban populations and agricultural activities.

A large portion of snow hydrology groups are pursuing new methods for incorporating snow hydrology into distributed models over complex terrain through theoretical developments, model development and testing with field and remote sensing data sets. Snow hydrology is quite complex and involves both mass and energy balance calculations over a time-varying snow pack which is influenced by spatial location in the watershed, interaction with vegetation and redistribution by winds. Some researchers seek to accurately capture snow dynamics at a point and over a domain as the spatial pattern of snow cover area is readily observable from remote sensing.

== Overview ==
Snow and ice account for around 75% of Earth's entire freshwater volume but lacks the capability of reliable applications. In comparison, the water supplied from rivers and freshwater lakes carries a consistent annual source of water. These natural bodies of water are formed through springs, rainfall and mountainous snow runoff. According to estimates, snow represents about 5% of the precipitation that reaches the Earth's surface. Due to the large amount of water held within these sources, snow hydrology has been a growing study in the field of river tides and seasonal flow rates.

Despite common belief, snow fall is not the main cause for the destruction of organic matter in cold climates. The most damaging aspect is cold temperature winds that exist above the snow pack surface. Studies have shown the insulating properties of snow defend the plants and small animals in the environment from these frigid winds. “The snow itself is the habitat for various micro-organisms like snow worms and algae.” Without consistent annual snowfall, many plants would be destroyed due to frost damage. Both ice worms (Mesenchytraeus Solifugus) and green algae are unique organisms that can live in glacial and snowy habitats.

== History ==
Though most of the knowledge in the field of snow hydrology has been discovered in the last two centuries, there is evidence that some understanding existed as early as 500-428BC in the Greek states.

=== Ancient ===
Some of the earliest evidence that supports an ancient technical understanding of snow movement was produced by the Greeks. Anaxagoras, an ancient Greek notes:

"the water in the Nile comes from the snow in Ethiopia, which freezes in the winter and melts in the summer".

The upper class Greeks in these city states were shown to have basic understanding of the cooling properties that snow exhibited. Upper class citizens would have hay lined pits dug beneath their homes and bring snow down from the mountains to fill them. Perishable food items could then be stored in these pits for months at a time.

The Christian Bible contains numerous passages in its text that express a basic understanding of the hydrological cycle. Each of the following verses shows fundamental ideas behind the hydrological processes.

- Isaiah 55:10
- Psalm 135:7
- Jeremiah 10:13
- Job 36:27–29
- Ecclesiastes 1:7
- Isaiah 55:10
- Job 26:8
- Job 37:11
- Genesis 7:11
- Job 38:16

=== Modern ===
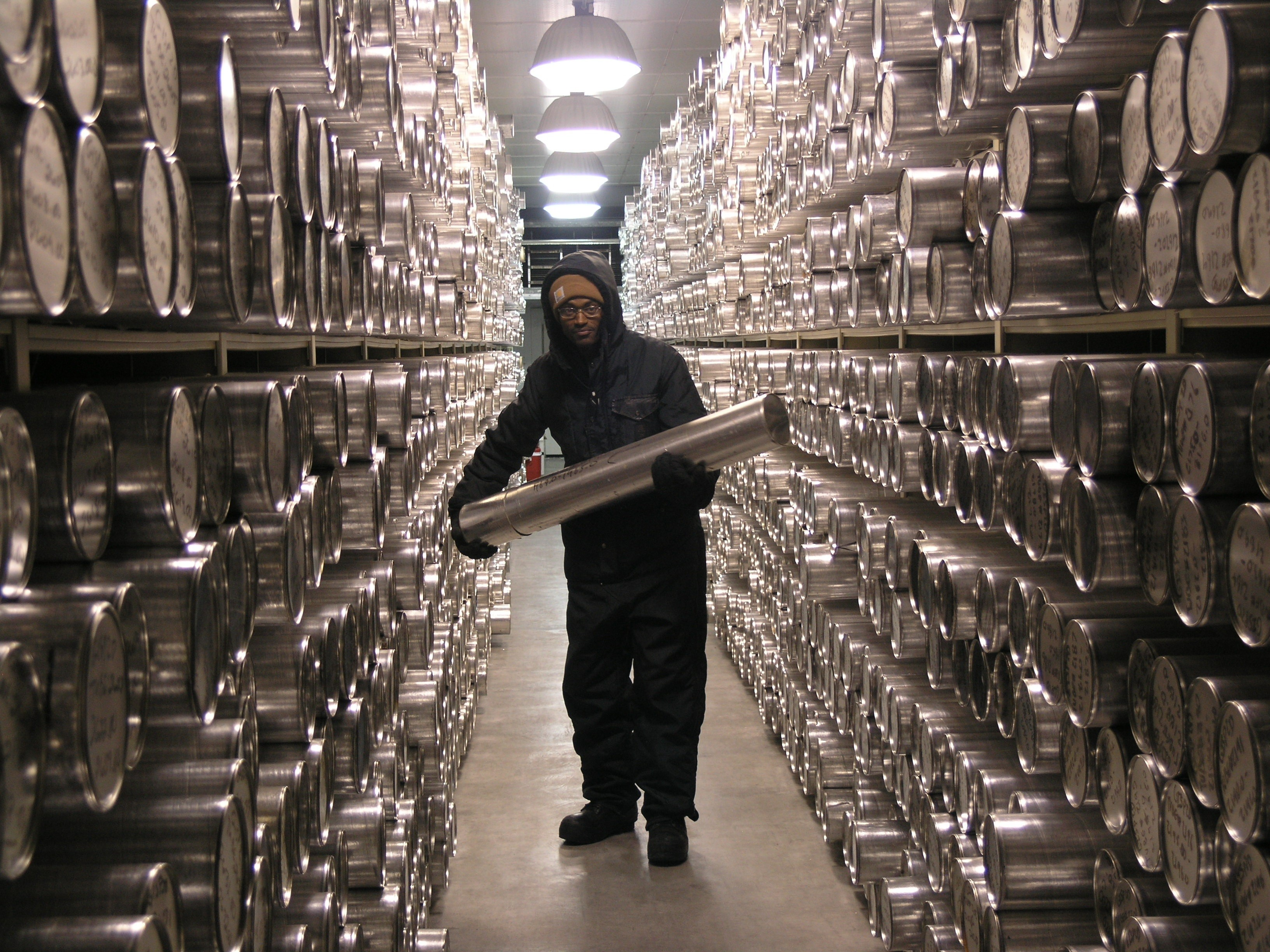
Retrieving an ice core from the National Ice Core Lab

One of the earliest modern records of the snow hydrology practice, was introduced by the geologist, Antonio Vallisnieri around the time of the 17th century. His work Theorized, “That rivers arising from springs in the Italian Alps came from rain and snowmelt seeping into underground channels."

The first American research labs were introduced during the 1940s in order to solve the many problems associated with snow movement in the World War II era. These three labs were:

- Central sierra Snow Laboratory (CSSL)
- Upper Columbia Snow Laboratory (USCL)
- Willamette Basin Snow Laboratory (WBSL)

Currently there are hundreds of snow hydrology labs and sensing devices placed throughout the world. As of 2004, every continent was under observation with the exception of Antarctica. Since then, several sensing devices have been established in the Arctic Circle, allowing for constant observation. Using these in part with satellite imaging systems has produced an accurate depiction of underlying landmass, which was unknown in the past.

== Hydrologists ==
Snow hydrologists focus specifically on movement and composition of snow and ice, within the field of hydrology. The knowledge gained from this career is most commonly used in weather forecasting and ecological/ agricultural jobs, which require knowledge about the effects of snow migration. They retrieve the information they need through depth, density, and composition readings, as well as various remote sensing techniques. Workers in this field can work for government agencies, research firms and public information services.

== Equipment and testing ==
=== Terrestrial measurements ===
The study of snow and glacial movement, though now largely dependent on remote sensing devices, still requires in field techniques to accurately determine the validity of the data. These tools and techniques range from simple, such as a depth spike, to complex, such as the core sampling machines used to check for variations in ice composition. Three common types of terrestrial measurements are:

- Snow Depth-This is a measurement from the snow surface to the ground in meters. It is commonly does over a large time span using immobile graduated stakes.
- Snow Water Equivalency- A measuring tool which represents the vertical depth of water that would accumulate in an area, if all the snow and ice were melted in that given area.
- Snow Density- This is the value found by dividing the water equivalency measurement by the snow depth reading.

=== Remote sensing ===
Remote sensing technology is a recent tool in the field of snow hydrology that was developed in response to a growing outlook in the parametric studies (study of a subject over time) of hydrology formed in the mid 19th century. Compared to the deterministic (concept that there are no random events) approach used in earlier years, this technique created minimal human interaction with the environment and in field equipment. Currently there are thousands of sensing sites around the globe. Each site is capable of receiving data from any number of remote sensing techniques.

The Landsat-MSS is one of the most common used tools. It is capable of detecting and categorizing snow cover into three zones for data calculations. The first zone is an area with 100% snow cover. The second zone is known as the transition zone, which is a mixture of snow covered regions and non snow covered regions. This zone is commonly measured at a 50% snow composition value. The Final zone is snow-free (=aper). The combined reading of these three measurements creates a relatively accurate estimate for the amount of snow within the scanned region. Several detrimental variables for this technique are cloud cover, extreme sunlight and heavy vegetation.

==== Detection tools ====
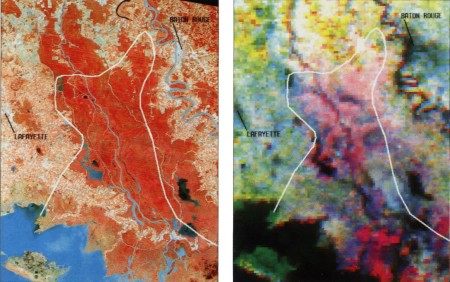
Image taken of the Atchafalaya Basin using MSS and NOAA

As of 2004, every continent, with the exception of Antarctica has been under regular surveillance through the use of remote sensing satellites.

Several sensing tools are listed below:

- Landsat multispectral scanner system (MSS)
- Thermatic Mapper (MT)
- Systéme Probatoire d’Observation de la Terre-multispectral (SPOT-XS)
- National Oceanic and Atmospheric Administration-Advanced Very-High Resolution Radiometer (NOAA/AVHRR)
- Marine Observation Satellite-Multispectral Electronic Self-Scanning Radiometer (MOS-MESSR)
- Indian Remote Sensing Satellite-linear imaging self-scanned sensor (IRS-LISS)
- Moderate-resolution Imaging Spectro-radiometer (MODIS)
- Medium-Resolution Imaging Spectrometer (MERIS)

== Applications ==
=== Meteorology ===
Meteorology is the scientific study of weather. It is used in weather forecasting to predict atmospheric events prior to their occurrence. Snow hydrology is used to estimate the characteristics of snowfall in different topographical regions. This includes information on snow depth, density, composition and possible runoff patterns. It is also widely used in the study of natural phenomena such as: blizzards, avalanche, ice pellets and hail in order to help foresee natural disasters.

=== Glaciology ===
Glaciology is a similar study to snow hydrology that focuses specially on glacier movement. Glaciers are large masses of ice that are able to slowly migrate over time, through the process of snow accumulation. This study analyzes their past and current growth as well as composition to predict how they have shaped the landmasses they inhabit. Two major studies related to Glaciology are global warming and glacial maximum's (ice ages).

== Current issues ==
=== Global warming ===
In recent years the most predominant topic related to snow hydrology has been global warming. The underlying concept states that human construction and production of emissions, has created a number of gaseous chemical compounds which add to existing greenhouse gases. Gases such as CO_{2} and CH_{4} trap heat in the atmosphere, adding to global climate change. These gases are usually broken down relatively quickly through environmental processes like photosynthesis; however, in recent years, studies have shown their atmospheric composition is increasing. Some studies believe this is a natural part of the Earth's cycle while others claim it is due to the growing amount of fossil fuel emissions and the gradual deforestation of oxygen producing plants. The theory suggests that these changes in temperature, could affect the way ice and snow forms over the Earth's crust, initiating a glacial shifting process, possibly created a rise in sea level from 0.5 meters to 1.5 meters. This change then could influence the salinity of the ocean, causing environmental changes, altering oceanic current and organisms that inhabit it.

== See also ==
- Cryopedology
- Geology
- Glaciology
- Hydrology
- List of glaciers
- Meteorology
- Snow
- Thermography
- Water cycle
