= Achaeta =

Achaeta may refer to:

- Achaeta (annelid), genus of annelids
- Achaeta, genus of plants, synonym of Koeleria

== See also ==
- Acheta, genus of crickets
