= Globulidrilus =

Scientific classification
- Kingdom: Animalia
- Phylum: Annelida
- Clade: Pleistoannelida
- Clade: Sedentaria
- Class: Clitellata
- Order: Enchytraeida
- Family: Enchytraeidae
- Genus: Globulidrilus; Christensen & Dózsa-Farkas, 2012

Genus of annelids

Globulidrilus is a genus of annelids belonging to the family Enchytraeidae.

Species:

- Globulidrilus helgei Christensen & Dózsa-Farkas, 2012
- Globulidrilus riparius (Bretscher, 1899)
