= Enchytraeus buchholzi =

Scientific classification
- Kingdom: Animalia
- Phylum: Annelida
- Clade: Pleistoannelida
- Clade: Sedentaria
- Class: Clitellata
- Order: Enchytraeida
- Family: Enchytraeidae
- Genus: Enchytraeus
- Species: E. buchholzi

Binomial name
- Enchytraeus buchholzi Vejdovský, 1879

Species of annelid worm

Enchytraeus buchholzi, Grindal worms, (described by František Vejdovsky in 1879) are enchytraeid oligochaete worms. They are found in temperate meadows and disturbed roadside verges. The scientific name probably covers a group of morphologically indistinguishable species, which would complicate their use as test species in substitution for E. albidus, a species commonly cultivated in the laboratory for toxicity tests, according to OECD.

For aquarists "Grindal worms" are treated as smaller relatives of whiteworms, but usually only grow to about 10 mm and thus are an ideal size for most small freshwater fish, both adults and larger fry. Mrs. Morten Grindal, of Sweden, who was prominent in the development of culturing techniques for whiteworms, was apparently the first aquarist to isolate this smaller species. Grindal worms can be cultured exactly as whiteworms but are a much more adaptable species and have a greater tolerance for warmer temperatures. Maturity has been reported to occur around 16 days at 20 °C, the clitellum forming when the worms are about 3~4 mm. The generation period (cocoon to cocoon) is about a month at 20 °C.

== Uses ==
Enchytraeus buchholzi/Grindal worms are cultured by aquarists as a fish food, often on a bed of ground coconut shells, or coir, with oatmeal. They are used for conditioning tropical fish before spawning, or for young fast-growing fish.

In laboratory testing, Enchytraeus buchholzi were kept in an incubator at 15 ± 2 °C. Water loss and food were replenished if necessary during the test period. After 21 days the offspring and the surviving adults were counted. For two moisture levels (5% and 20% water content) the segment number of the surviving adults was counted. From 20% up to 40% water content Enchytraeus buchholzi showed no significant difference in reproduction. Below 20% and above 40%, the number of offspring was reduced. No juveniles were found at 5% water content, although adult survival was equal to higher moisture levels. Reproduction was decreased at 30% water content compared to 25% and 35% water content. Low soil moisture inhibited not only reproduction, but had also a negative effect on the growth of the parent generation.
