= Bryodrilus =

Scientific classification
- Domain: Eukaryota
- Kingdom: Animalia
- Phylum: Annelida
- Clade: Pleistoannelida
- Clade: Sedentaria
- Class: Clitellata
- Order: Tubificida
- Family: Enchytraeidae
- Genus: Bryodrilus; Ude, 1892

Genus of annelid worms

Bryodrilus is a genus of annelids belonging to the family Enchytraeidae.

Species:

- Bryodrilus ehlersi Ude, 1892
