= Trevor Kincaid =

Canadian-American scientist (1872–1970)

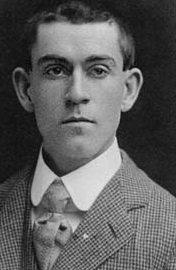
- Kincaid c. 1902
- Born: December 21, 1872; Peterborough, Ontario, Canada
- Died: July 1, 1970 (aged 97); Seattle, Washington, United States
- Education: B.A., University of Washington (1899); M.A., University of Washington (1901)
- Occupations: scientist, professor, entomologist, marine biologist, malacologist
- Employer: University of Washington
- Relatives: Zoe Kincaid Penlington (sister)

Trevor Charles Digby Kincaid (December 21, 1872 – July 1, 1970) was a Canadian-American scientist and professor at the University of Washington who achieved national acclaim for his scientific achievements while an undergraduate student. Kincaid's interests ranged from insect life to marine biology to mollusks, though he once described himself as an "omniologist" (one who studies everything). He is best known for introducing the gypsy moth parasite to the United States, for helping establish the Washington state oyster industry, and as the driving force behind the creation of the Friday Harbor Laboratories. Kincaid is responsible for the identification and naming of hundreds of species; at least 47 plant and animal species were, in turn, named after him. In 1938 he was designated Alumnus Summa Laude Dignatus of the University of Washington, that school's highest honor for its alumni.

== Early life and education ==
=== Family and childhood ===
Trevor Kincaid was born in Peterborough, Ontario, in 1872. He was the son of Robert Kincaid, a first generation Canadian whose own father had immigrated from Ireland in the early 19th century. Robert Kincaid received his medical degree from Queen's University and undertook his internship at Bellevue Hospital in New York City. In 1861, Kincaid found himself caught up in the war hysteria that followed the capitulation of Fort Sumter and volunteered to join the United States Army, serving during the American Civil War first as a field surgeon and, later, as a member of the medical staff at Armory Square Hospital in Washington, D.C. After the war he returned to Peterborough and took up private medical practice, eventually marrying Mary Bell, who gave birth to Trevor.

In his youth, Kincaid was inquisitive about nature and enjoyed playing lacrosse with friends. A series of bad investments by Robert Kincaid, however, led to the family's bankruptcy, and the Kincaids left Peterborough for Olympia, Washington, in 1889. A paucity of family funds led Kincaid to work a variety of odd jobs for several years following high school, but a chance encounter with University of Washington (UW) biology professor Orson "Bugs" Johnson and the Young Naturalists Society led him to resolve to spend his meager savings to relocate to Seattle and enroll at the university.

=== University and national acclaim ===
As a student, Kincaid showed exceptional aptitude for the natural sciences and achieved national attention for his scientific achievements. In 1897, while still an undergraduate, he accompanied David Starr Jordan to the Pribilof Islands as part of a study of seals undertaken by the American Fur Seal Commission. Back in Washington, Kincaid's interests focused more on insect life, and a report that year in the Boston Evening Transcript noted that he had discovered 41 new species of bees, including 22 of the genus Osmia. Theodore Dru Alison Cockerell, at the time one of America's leading entomologists, directed a portion of the sizable Kincaid bee collection to the Smithsonian Institution.

Kincaid missed commencement exercises at the University of Washington due to his appointment as the entomologist attached to the Harriman Alaska Expedition. During that trip, completed before his 27th birthday, he collected about 8,000 specimens of insect, resulting in the discovery and naming of more than 240 new species, including Mesenchytraeus harrimani, which he named after the expedition's patron, E. H. Harriman.

Following his graduation from the University of Washington, Kincaid went on to earn a master's degree.

== Career ==
=== Teaching and research career ===
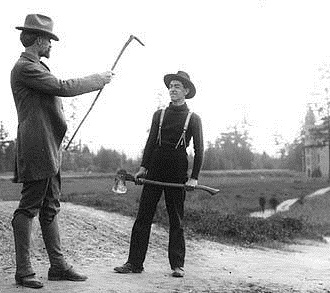
Edmond Meany (left) with Trevor Kincaid (right) in 1905

In 1901 Kincaid was hired as a lecturer in biology at the University of Washington. The following year he was promoted to assistant professor and made chairman of the university's newly created zoology department, a position he would continue to hold until his retirement 35 years later.

In his new position, Kincaid began scouting the Puget Sound region for a suitable site at which the university could establish a marine research field station. After evaluating Port Townsend and Rocky Bay, he chose Friday Harbor as the location for what is now known as Friday Harbor Laboratories, concluding that the "great wealth of life in that area" made up for its extremely remote location. After running a laboratory at temporary sites near Friday Harbor for several years, Kincaid personally petitioned for the transfer to the university of the 484-acre Point Caution site (an area of San Juan Island that had been set aside as a military reserve to be used in the event of war with the United Kingdom). In 1921 the U.S. government finally ceded Point Caution to the university.

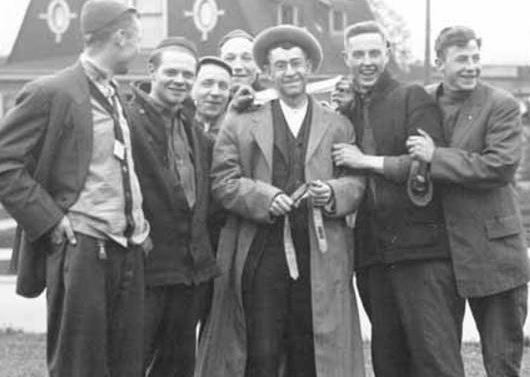
Trevor Kincaid (center), surrounded by students, on the University of Washington campus in 1914

Kincaid was dispatched to Japan in 1908 by the United States Department of Agriculture to identify and collect a natural parasite for the gypsy moth, which, at the time, was creating havoc in Massachusetts. His continued research on that parasite, a eulophid wasp, took him to Russia the following year. The parasite that he discovered was bred by the US Department of Agriculture as a gypsy moth repellent for many years thereafter. His later work on oyster breeding earned him the nickname the "father of the Northwest oyster industry". During his years at the UW, he was also credited with helping to establish the university's College of Fisheries.

=== Later studies ===
Kincaid was compelled to retire in 1937 due to the University of Washington's mandatory retirement age. He continued research as a professor emeritus into his 80s, purchasing a hand printing press that he used to self-publish a series of reports based on previous research he had made of snails. These papers were published under the name "Calliostoma Press". Proofread by his wife Louise, they were known for being virtually free of typographic errors.

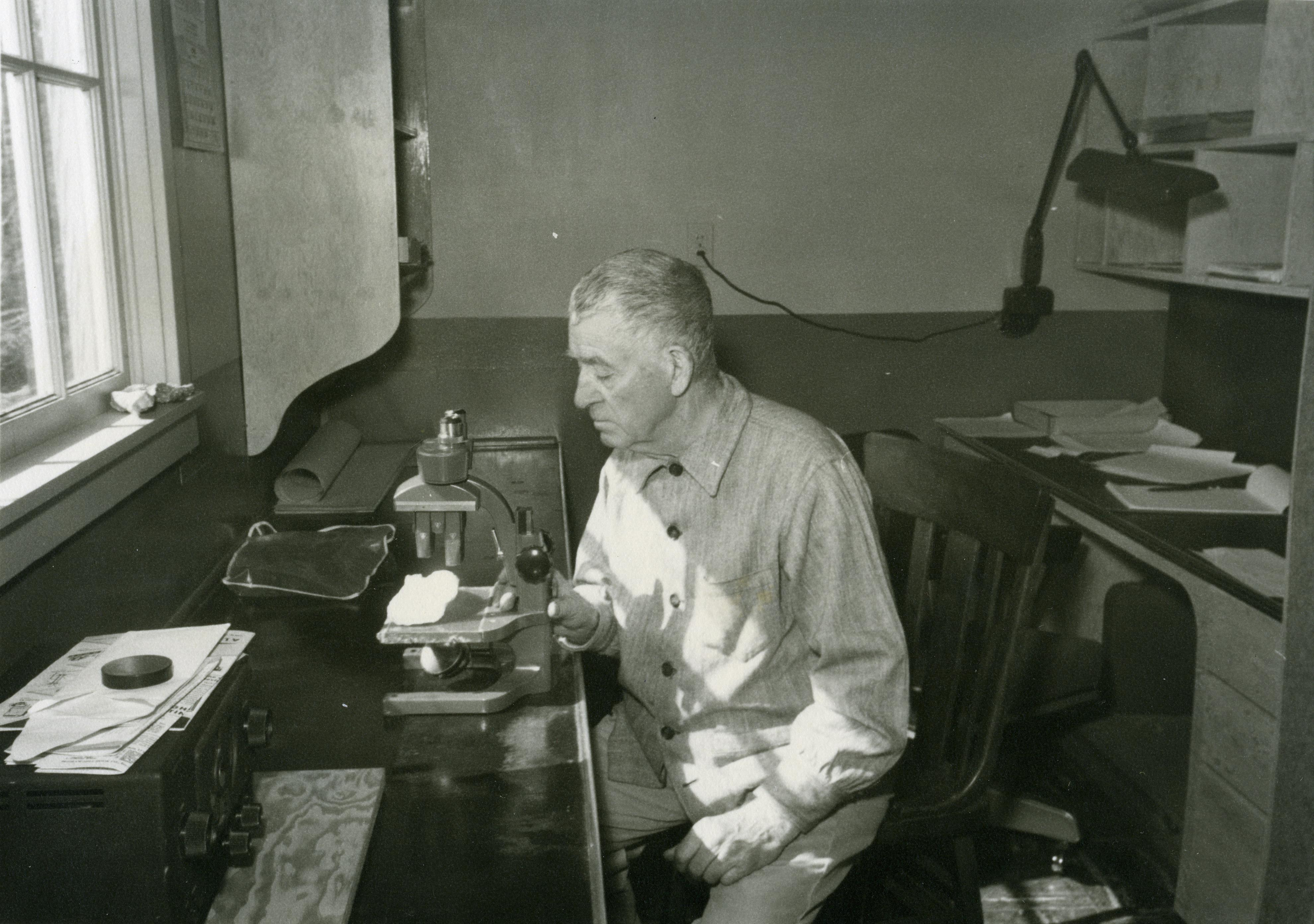
Trevor Kincaid at a workbench with a microscope, c. 1950

== Personal life ==
Kincaid married Louise Pennell on August 23, 1917. Pennell had received her master's degree in zoology from the University of Washington the preceding June.

== Death and legacy ==
Kincaid died in 1970. Kincaid Hall at the University of Washington, constructed in 1971, is named after him.

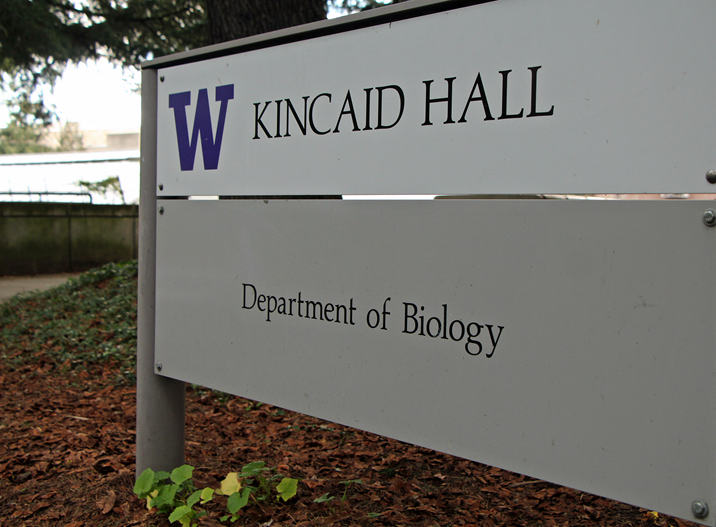
Sign outside Kincaid Hall on the University of Washington campus

At least 47 plant and animal species have also been named after Kincaid.

In 1938 Kincaid became the first person to be recognized by the University of Washington as Alumnus Summa Laude Dignatus ("Alumnus Worthy of Highest Praise"), the university's highest honor for its past graduates.

== Selected publications ==
- Kincaid, T. (1966). "A problematic sense-organ found upon the maxillae of intertidal staphylinid beetles". Transactions of the American Microscopical Society. 85 (2): 275–278. doi:10.2307/3224639. JSTOR 3224639.
- Kincaid, T. (1964). "A gastropod parasitic on the holothurian, Parastichopus californicus (Stimpson)". Transactions of the American Microscopical Society. 83 (4): 373–376. doi:10.2307/3224753. JSTOR 3224753.
- Kincaid, T. (1963). "The ant-plant, Orthocarpus pusillus, Bentham". Transactions of the American Microscopical Society. 82 (1): 101–105. doi:10.2307/3223826. JSTOR 3223826.
- Kincaid, T. (1930). "Control of the European brown scale by chalcid parasites". Journal of Economic Entomology. 23 (5): 809. doi:10.1093/jee/23.5.809a.
- Kincaid, T. B. (1928). "Development of oyster industry of the Pacific". Transactions of the American Fisheries Society. 58 (1): 117–122. doi:10.1577/1548-8659(1928)58[117:DOOIOT]2.0.CO;2.
- Smith, E. V., and Kincaid, T. (1920). "A report on the taking of immature salmon in the coastal waters of the state of Washington". Twenty-Eighth and Twenty-Ninth Annual Reports of the State Fish Commissioner. State of Washington Department of Fish and Game. Olympia, Washington. pp. 39–46.
- Kincaid, T. (1900). "The Tenthredinoidea". Proceedings of the Washington Academy of Sciences, Vol. 2, pp. 341–365.
- Kincaid, T. (1899). "The Psychodidae of the Pacific Coast". Entomological News. 10: 30–37.
