= Zoe Kincaid Penlington =

American writer

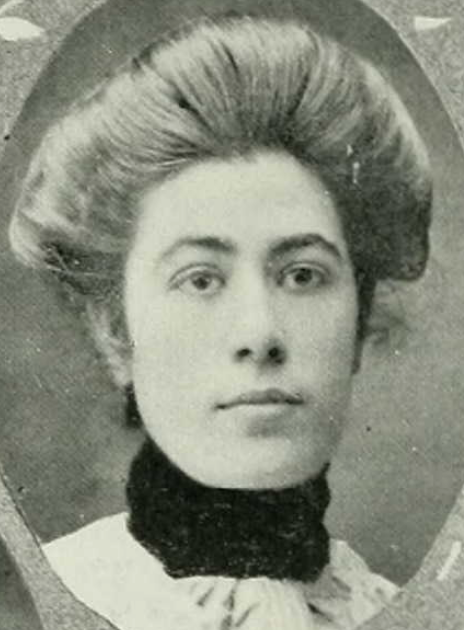
- Zoe Kincaid (later Penlington), from the 1902 yearbook of the University of Washington
- Born: Zoe Rowena Kincaid; March 2, 1878; Peterborough, Ontario, Canada
- Died: March 28, 1944 (aged 66); Ventura, California, U.S.
- Occupations: Journalist, arts critic, editor
- Relatives: Trevor Kincaid (brother)

Zoë Rowena Kincaid Penlington (March 2, 1878 – March 28, 1944) was a Canadian-born American journalist, critic, and editor. She wrote Kabuki: The Popular Stage in Japan (1925), considered "the first extensive study of kabuki in English". (Her first name is written both with and without the diaeresis in sources.)

== Early life and education ==
Zoe Kincaid was born in Peterborough, Ontario, and raised in Olympia, Washington, the daughter of Robert Kincaid and Mary Margaret Bell Kincaid. Her father was an Irish-born Canadian surgeon and a veteran of the Union Army in the American Civil War. Her older brother Trevor Kincaid became a noted biologist. She graduated from Olympia High School, and from the University of Washington in 1902. In college she was the founding editor of Tyee, the UW yearbook, and the literary editor of the school newspaper. In 1908, she was elected president of the University of Washington Alumnae Association.

== Career ==
Kincaid worked as a journalist in Washington state as a young woman, especially at The Westerner, a regional literary magazine. She moved to Tokyo in 1908, to write and teach English. She was founding co-editor Japan Magazine, an English-language monthly launched in 1910 as the official publication of the Tokyo Industrial Association. Her first article for Japan Magazine was a profile of meteorologist Itaru Nonaka and his wife Chiyoko, who maintained a weather station on Mount Fuji.

With her husband Penlington she also helped produce The Far East, a weekly English magazine. The magazine's offices were destroyed in the 1923 Great Kantō earthquake. She was a theatre critic, and a member of the International Press Association of Japan. She wrote Kabuki: The Popular Stage in Japan (1925), the first English-language book about the kabuki tradition, and "a much needed and very important history of the popular Japanese stage," according to The New York Times reviewer Charles DeKay. She also wrote about noh dance-dramas and bunraku puppetry. She worked with a translator to adapt two kabuki plays by Kido Okamoto, published as The Human Pillar and The Mask-Maker.

== Publications ==
- "Nonaka the Mountaineer" (1910)
- "The Hidden Genius of the East" (1921)
- Kabuki: The Popular Stage of Japan (1925)
- "Playgoing in Present-Day Japan" (1926)
- "The Stage of Today in Japan" (1927)
- "The Virile Drama of Japan" (1927)
- "Hina Matsuri: The Girls' Festival" (1927)
- "An International Theater" (1927)
- The Mask-maker: A Drama in Three Acts (1928)
- Tokyo Vignettes (1933)

== Personal life ==
Kincaid married British journalist John Newton Penlington in 1910. Her husband died in 1933, and she returned to the United States permanently in 1941. She died from a ruptured appendix in 1944, at the age of 66, while visiting her sister in Ventura, California.
