= Mammoth Mountain Resort =

Ski resort in California, United States

Mammoth Mountain
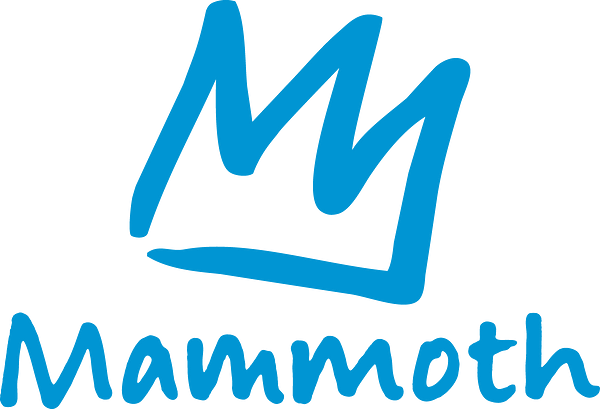

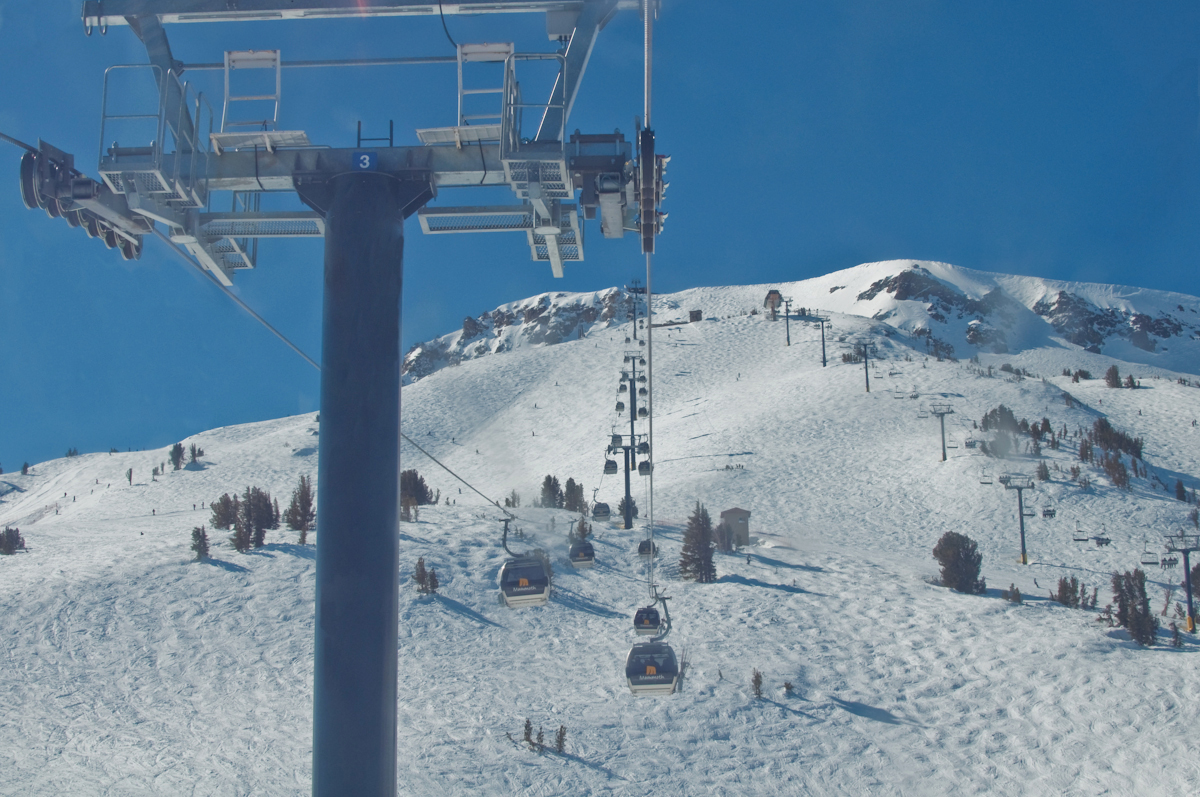
- Gondola to summit in 2010

- Location in California Mammoth Mountain (the United States)
- Location: Mammoth Mountain; Sierra Nevada; Mono & Madera Counties, California
- Nearest city: Mammoth Lakes, California
- Coordinates: 37°37′50″N 119°01′57″W
- Status: Operating
- Owner: Alterra Mountain Company
- Vertical: 3,100 ft (940 m)
- Top elevation: 11,053 ft (3,369 m)
- Base elevation: 7,953 ft (2,424 m) at Eagle Lodge
- Skiable area: 3,500 acres (1,420 ha)
- Trails: 175 named 15% beginner 48% intermediate 37% advanced
- Longest run: 3 mi (4.8 km)
- Lift system: 25 lifts
- Lift capacity: 59,000 passengers/hr
- Terrain parks: Disco Playground, Wonderland Playground, X-Course, Forest Trail Park, Jibs Galore, Transition Park, South Park, Main Park
- Snowfall: 400 in (1,020 cm)
- Snowmaking: Yes, 700 acres (280 ha) covering 81 trails
- Night skiing: No
- Website: mammothmountain.com

Mammoth Mountain is a ski resort in eastern California, located on the east side of the Sierra Nevada mountain range within the Inyo National Forest. The resort is located in the town of Mammoth Lakes, California. The resort covers 3,500 acres (1,420 ha) of skiable terrain, with a vertical drop of 3,100 feet (940 m) and a summit elevation of 11,059 feet (3,371 m). It receives an average of 400 inches (1,020 cm) of snowfall annually and typically offers a ski season from November until May, with some seasons extending into the summer months.

Mammoth Mountain, established by Dave McCoy in the 1940s, developed from a small ski area into a major resort after receiving a U.S. Forest Service permit in 1953 and constructing its first ski lift in 1955. Intrawest Corporation acquired a stake in the 1990s, leading to real estate development, including The Village at Mammoth. In 2005, McCoy sold his majority stake to Starwood Capital Group for $365 million. The resort has undergone infrastructure improvements, including high-speed lifts and a gondola to an interpretive center. In 2017, Mammoth Resorts announced its sale by Starwood to a partnership of Aspen Skiing Company and KSL Capital Partners, later named Alterra Mountain Company.

Under McCoy, the resort weathered the 1973 oil crisis, a 1979 avalanche that destroyed a ski lift, and a 1991 drought that led to layoffs. In early 2006, five unrelated skier fatalities occurred over several days in January followed in April by the deaths of three ski patrollers in the 2006 Mammoth Mountain Ski Patrol deaths. In 2025, two separate avalanches on Lincoln Mountain resulted in the deaths of two ski patrollers.

== History and ownership ==
Mammoth was founded by McCoy, a hydrographer for the Los Angeles Department of Water and Power. As a member of the Eastern Sierra Ski Club in the 1930s, he noticed that Mammoth Mountain consistently held more snow than other mountains. The Ski Club had a portable rope tow. McCoy bought the rope tow from the club in 1941 and usually kept it at Mammoth. In 1953, the United States Forest Service awarded a permit to McCoy to operate the ski area, leading to the opening of the mountain's first lodge, "The Pit.". The first permanent mechanical lift, Chair 1, was installed in 1955. The initial chair was a two-seater with 900 person capacity.

McCoy faced adversity in growing the ski area: drought in 1958–59, the 1973 oil crisis, and only 94" inches of snow during the 1976–1977 season, the worst in Mammoth's history. The mountain also had an avalanche in 1979 that destroyed a ski lift, Between 1970 and 1985, fifteen new chairlifts were opened. In 1988, Chair 1 became a high-speed four-seater, and then was updated with a Doppelmayr retrofit in 1996. Snowboarding was allowed on all slopes in 1989. There was a prolonged drought that led to layoffs in 1991.

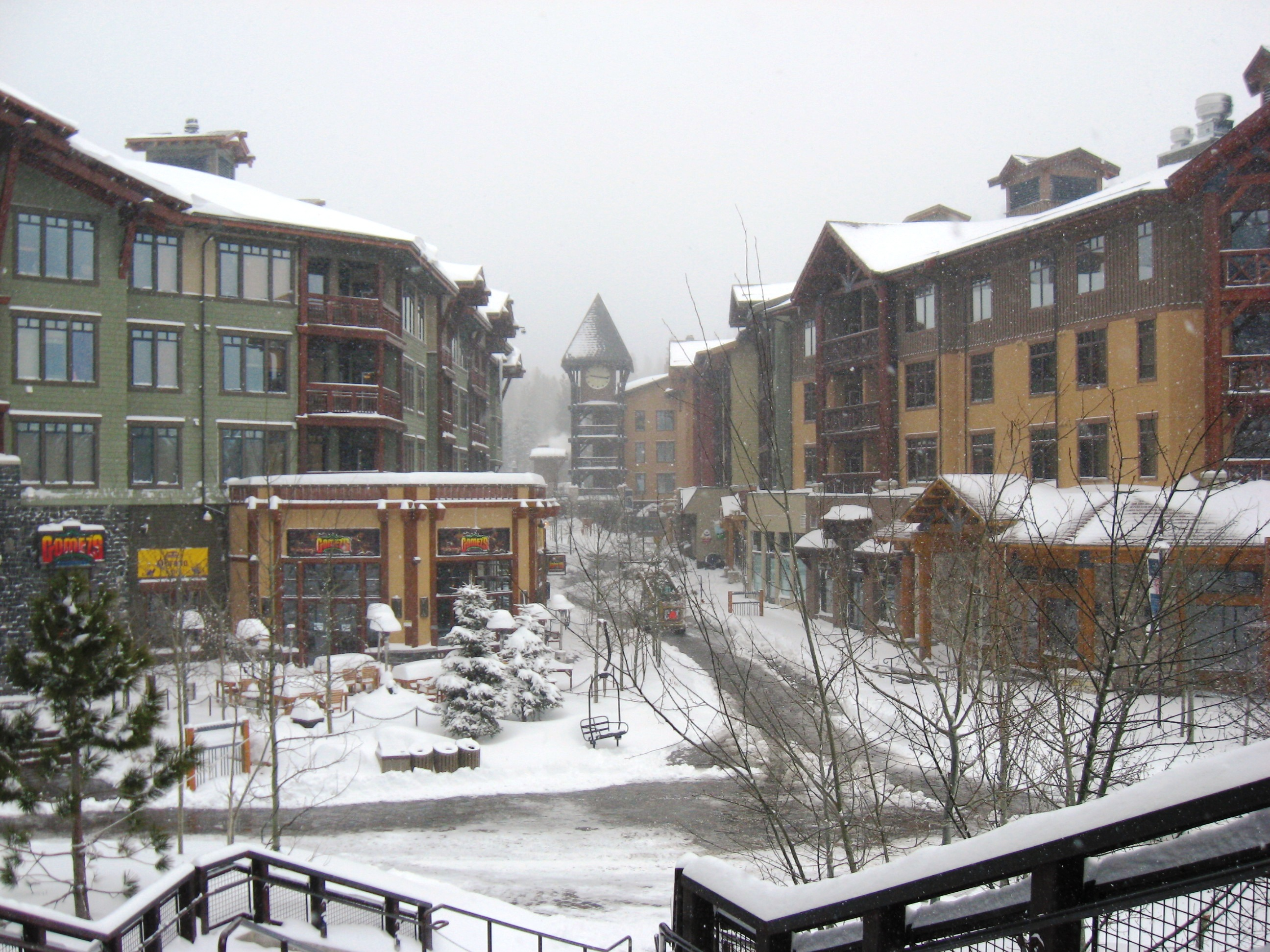
The Village at Mammoth as seen from the Village Gondola station in April 2010.

In January 1996, Intrawest Corporation and Mammoth Mountain Ski area announced that Intrawest Corporation had purchased 33% of Mammoth and June Mountain ski operations, as well as all of the developable real estate owned by Mammoth Mountain Ski Area. In 1998, Intrawest increased their partnership interest to 58%. The development of three new village areas: The Village at Mammoth, Sierra Star, and Juniper Springs, brought new developments to the resort. On February 23, 2005, Dave McCoy announced the pending sale of his stake in Mammoth Mountain, after 68 years of running the ski area. On October 5, 2005, Mammoth announced that a majority stake would be sold for $365 million to Starwood Capital Group, a private equity fund specializing in real estate run by Barry Sternlicht. In 2014, Mammoth acquired Big Bear Mountain Resorts.

In 2017, Mammoth Resorts announced its sale by Starwood to a partnership of Aspen Skiing Company and KSL Capital Partners, later named Alterra Mountain Company. Mammoth has maintained a fleet of Snowcats to groom the terrain for many years. As of 2002, the resort had multi-million annual grooming program to manage up to 14,000 daily visitors. The resort operated 35 snowcats across two nightly shifts and processed 1,000 acres of terrain.

The 2022–2023 season began with 62 inches of snow in November, the highest total for that month since 2011. This early accumulation initiated a snow season that concluded with approximately 700 inches at the base and nearly 900 inches at the summit. In 2023, Chair 16 was upgraded from a four-person to a six-person model. In 2024, Chair 1 completed a similar update to a six-person model. In 2024, Alterra announced a plan to invest in lifts and infrastructure at Mammoth.

== Terrain ==
Mammoth Mountain terrain is primarily north-facing (65%), ensuring excellent snow retention. The east and west parts of mountain offer varied exposure, while the minimal south-facing terrain sees the most variable conditions. The top of the mountain has challenging chutes and groomed as well as mogul runs. There are eight Unbound terrain parks. Unbound Main, adjacent to Main Lodge, is highly praised by extreme snowboarding and skiing enthusiasts, and is one of the major attractions of the ski resort. The 15-passenger Gondola connects the pedestrian village to the Canyon Lodge base. Mammoth Mountain is located in California's Eastern Sierra approximately 36 mi (58 km) southwest of the Nevada state line. Because Bay Area residents have to drive across four mountain passes to reach Mammoth, most of the skiers are from the Los Angeles area. It is also approximately 23 mi (37 km) south-southeast from Tioga Pass on the eastern boundary of Yosemite. Mammoth Mountain is a lava-dome complex on the southwest rim of Long Valley Caldera. Its last magmatic eruption occurred about 50,000 years ago. Volcanic gas is emitted at several locations on the mountain. Due to the unique location and geography of Mammoth mountain storms that otherwise wouldn't reach mammoth do, they transverse over the resort, leading to particularly deep snow, and more frequent storms. Additionally, the Sierra Nevada range can be considered warmer than other U.S. ranges due to its unique circulatory patterns and elevation.

== Events ==
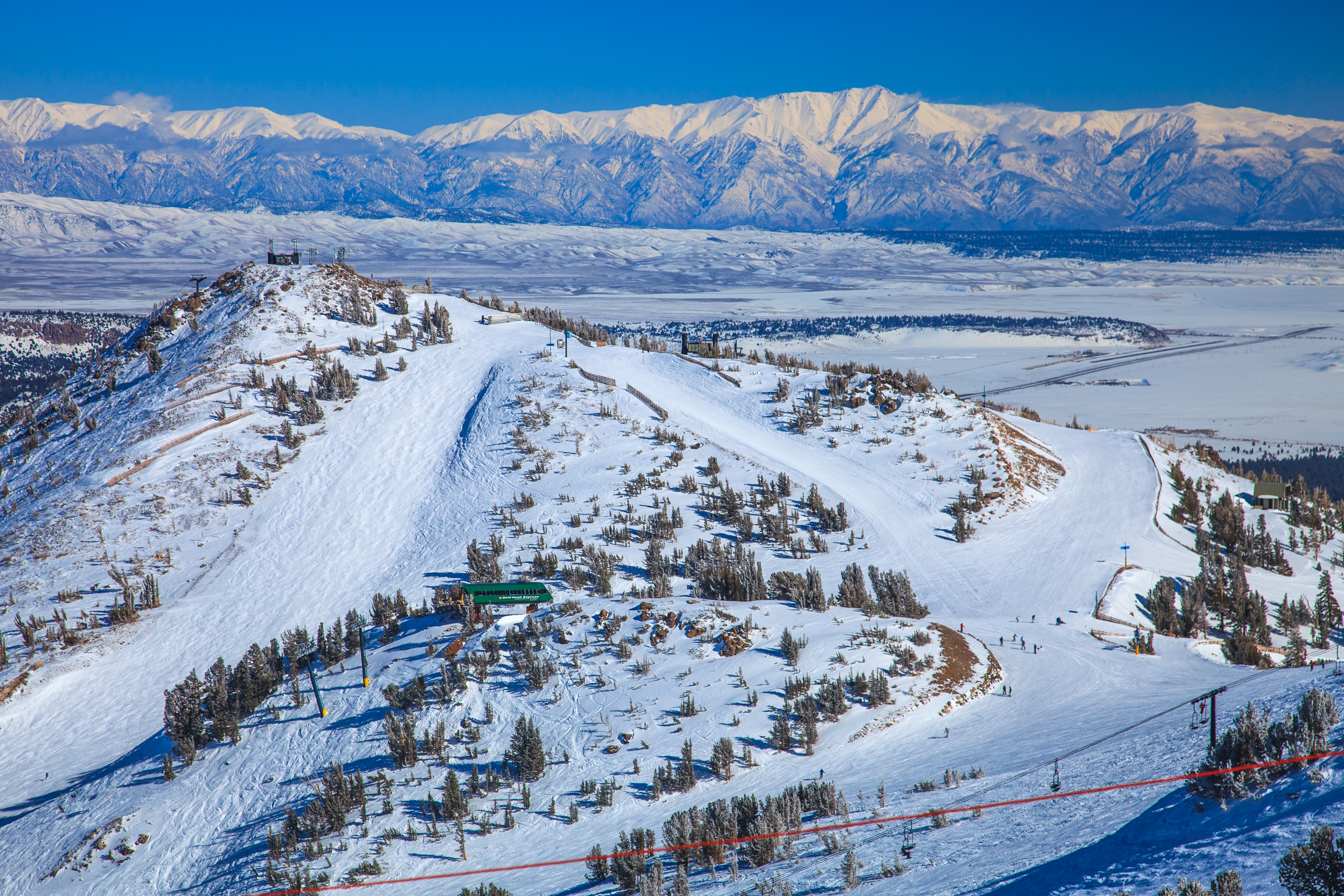
Aerial view of part of the ski area

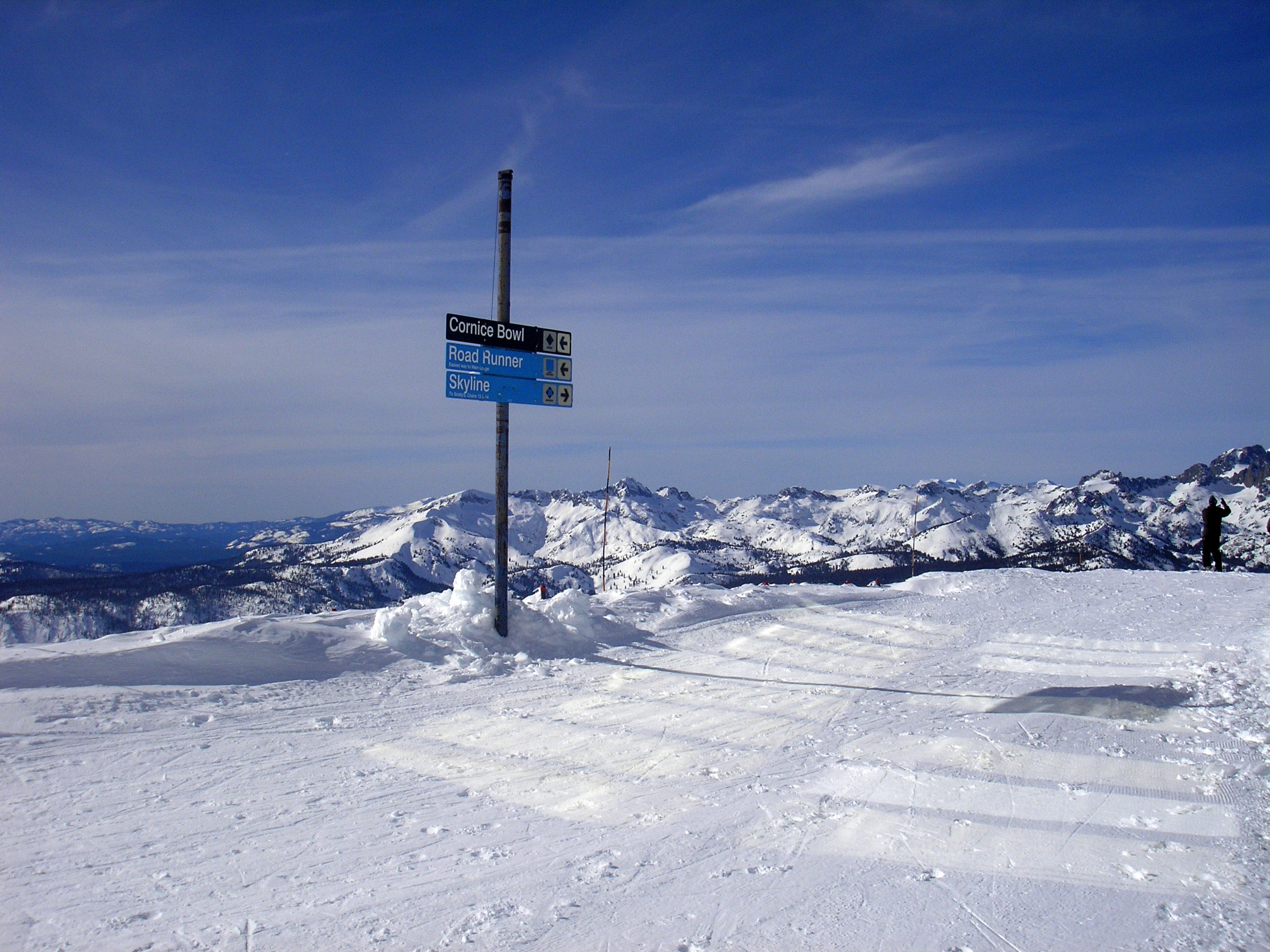
Cornice Bowl ski run at the summit of the mountain

Mammoth Mountain has hosted numerous ski and snowboarding events, including U.S. Grand Prix competitions, which serve as Olympic qualifiers for freestyle skiing and snowboarding. The mountain has also been a venue for FIS World Cup events, featuring disciplines such as halfpipe and slopestyle. Additionally, Mammoth Mountain serves as a training site for elite snowboarders due to its extensive terrain parks and consistent snowfall.

Outside of Professional competitive events, Mammoth Mountain has hosted an annual Pond Skim event at Canyon Lodge each April (when conditions allow) for nearly two decades. The event involves skiers and snowboarders attempting to skim across a pool of water/snowmelt on the snow while wearing costumes. The event attracts spectators who gather to watch and film participants as they attempt to skim the pool of snowmelt, with prizes and features for successful runs and unique captivating performances.

== Athletes ==
- Shaun White trained at Mammoth Mountain throughout his career later buying a stake in the resort.
- Danny Kass, a two-time Olympic silver medalist in halfpipe snowboarding, trained at Mammoth Mountain during his career.
- Chloe Kim, a two-time Olympic gold medalist in halfpipe snowboarding, currently trains at Mammoth Mountain.
- Jeff Anderson (snowboarder)
- Mason Aguirre, snowboarder who competed in 2006 Winter Olympics
- Penny McCoy, American alpine skier
- Dennis McCoy (alpine skier), American alpine Skier
- Linda Meyers, American alpine Skier
- Jill Kinmont Boothe, American alpine Skier
- A total of six Mammoth residents competed in the 2014 Winter Olympics in Sochi, Russia; Kelly Clark, Greg Bretz, John Teller, Trevor Jacob, and Stacey Cook represented the U.S. while Kaya Turski represented Canada.

== Safety and incidents ==
As of 2017, ski patrol uses explosives via howitzers that are leased from the U.S. Army to trigger controlled snow slides in high-risk avalanche areas.

=== Incidents ===
On December 13, 1973, Marvin Ray Critton, a ski patroller died in an explosives accident while performing avalanche control work. He was throwing the explosives above Chairlift 5 when the explosive accidentally discharged. Several ski runs at the resort are also named after his nickname "Critter," including Critters and New Critters. Within three weeks, in January 1974, a Mammoth ski area employee was in critical condition after an explosive used in avalanche mitigation went off in his hands.

In early 2006, the mountain had a series of five unrelated fatalities over a brief consecutive period. On January 26, a 16-year-old boy from San Diego died after taking a jump too fast on an intermediate run and missing the landing, despite wearing a helmet and reportedly being an experienced skier. The following day, January 27, a 39-year-old man from Laguna Niguel lost control at high speed on an intermediate trail, struck a tree after hitting a mogul, and died from his injuries four days later at Renown Regional Medical Center. The following day, on January 28, a 61-year-old Los Angeles dentist became disoriented and collided at full speed with a 30-foot boulder in a canyon area amid windy and snowy conditions that had closed some lifts. The next day, January 29, a 63-year-old man from Garden Grove suffered a fatal heart attack while skiing. According to a 2006 Los Angeles Times article, in a normal season, three people die in accidents or from natural causes, while only two people died during the previous season. In January 2006, a 31-year-old ski patrol member was caught in an avalanche while off-duty near Twin Lakes and suffered severe injuries including a broken back and leg that resulted in her death.

On April 6, 2006, three ski patrollers at the ski area died either due to a fall or combination of CO_{2} and hydrogen sulfide (H_{2}S) poisoning. Both gases are present on a known dangerous fumarole on the mountain and were more concentrated on that day because the fumarole had been covered by snow for days. Four patrollers were raising the fence around the fumarole, which had become buried due to heavy snowfall. The fumarole had melted a cavern below the snowbridge which collapsed under two of them. The pair of men fell 21 feet (6.4 m) and died on scene. Another died at a later time and seven others were injured. The oxygen masks used by the Mammoth Mountain ski patrol did not properly seal, allowing hazardous gases to come in.

In February 2025, two Mammoth Mountain Ski Patrol members were caught in an avalanche on Lincoln Mountain during mitigation efforts following a significant snowstorm that deposited about six feet of snow over 36 hours. One patroller was extracted and found responsive, while the other sustained serious injuries and was taken to the hospital. The area was closed to the public at the time, and the resort suspended all operations at noon for the remainder of the day. On February 22, the critical patroller died of their injuries. On Christmas Day 2025, a skier died after becoming immobilized in deep, heavy snow.

The next day, two ski patrollers were caught in an avalanche on Lincoln Mountain during mitigation work. The incident occurred on the morning of December 26, following a significant storm cycle that brought heavy snowfall to the ski area. One patroller survived with injuries, while 30-year-old Cole Murphy sustained critical injuries and died two days later on December 28. Following the incident, there were questions regarding the decision to send patrollers into the area on Lincoln Mountain during high-risk conditions following heavy snowfall. An article in the Los Angeles Times questioned California's safety regulations, which prohibit remote-controlled explosive towers used in other states. This restriction forces patrollers to mitigate hazards manually by entering dangerous slopes on foot. The article also noted concerns that the pressure to open terrain for holiday crowds may have influenced the timing of these high-stakes safety operations. As of February 2026, Cal/OSHA was investigating the resort's protocols and risk assessment.
