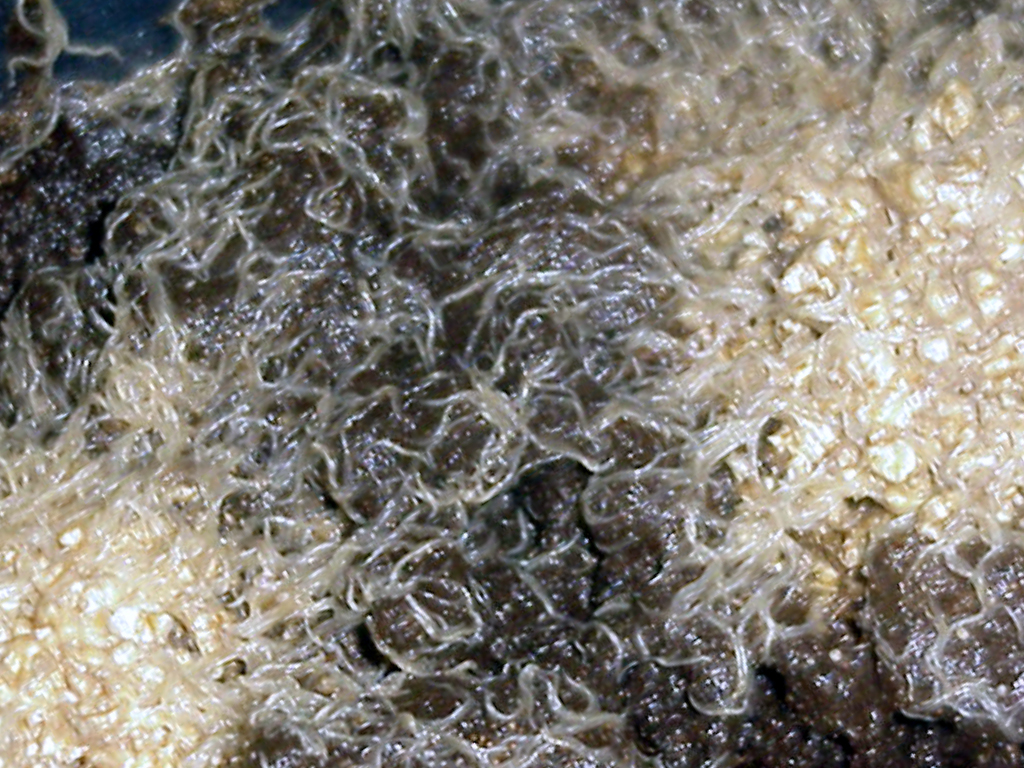
- A colony of Enchytraeus worms

Scientific classification
- Kingdom: Animalia
- Phylum: Annelida
- Clade: Pleistoannelida
- Clade: Sedentaria
- Class: Clitellata
- Order: Tubificida
- Family: Enchytraeidae
- Genus: Enchytraeus; Henle, 1837

Species
- 40+, see text

= Enchytraeus =

Genus of annelid worms

The genus Enchytraeus includes about 40 species of annelid worms. The term white worm is often used for all of the species in general, but specifically it is E. albidus which is named the white worm. This species is used as fish food by aquarium enthusiasts. E. buchholzi is known as the Grindal worm. It was named for the Swedish fish breeder that first raised the worm to feed her fish.

Some species are terrestrial, some semi-aquatic, and others marine. Some can be found in brackish water or on beaches. Several of these species lack sex organs and reproduce by fragmenting, notably E. fragmentosus, which gets its name from this characteristic.

Species include:

- Enchytraeus albidus ("White worms")
- Enchytraeus buchholzi ("Grindal worms")
- Enchytraeus capitatus
- Enchytraeus citrinus
- Enchytraeus fragmentosus
- Enchytraeus japonensis
- Enchytraeus kincaidi
- Enchytraeus lacteus
- Enchytraeus liefdeensis
- Enchytraeus minutus
- Enchytraeus multiannulatoides
- Enchytraeus multiannulatus
- Enchytraeus rupus
- Enchytraeus saxicola
- Enchytraeus variatus
