= Achaeta (annelid) =

Scientific classification
- Kingdom: Animalia
- Phylum: Annelida
- Clade: Pleistoannelida
- Clade: Sedentaria
- Class: Clitellata
- Order: Enchytraeida
- Family: Enchytraeidae
- Genus: Achaeta; Vejdovský, 1878

Genus of annelid worms

Achaeta is a genus of annelids belonging to the family Enchytraeidae.

The genus was first described by Vejdovský in 1878.

The genus has cosmopolitan distribution.

Species:

- Achaeta aberrans Nielsen & Christensen, 1961
- Achaeta abulba Graefe, 1989
- Achaeta affinis Nielsen & Christensen, 1959
- Achaeta afolliculata Sesma & Dózsa-Farkas, 1993
- Achaeta antefolliculata Dózsa-Farkas & Boros, 2005
- Achaeta becki Schmelz & Collado, 2005
- Achaeta bibulba Graefe, 1989
- Achaeta bifollicula Chalpuský, 1992
- Achaeta bohemica (Vejdovský, 1879)
- Achaeta borbonica Rota, 2015
- Achaeta brevivasa Graefe, 1980
- Achaeta bulbosa Nielsen & Christensen, 1961
- Achaeta camerani (Cognetti, 1899)
- Achaeta christenseni Prabhoo, 1966
- Achaeta coimbrensis Schmelz & Collado, 2013
- Achaeta danica Nielsen & Christensen, 1959
- Achaeta diddeni Graefe, 2007
- Achaeta eiseni Vejdovský, 1878
- Achaeta etrusca Rota, 1995
- Achaeta florens Schmelz, Chen & Józefowska, 2024
- Achaeta gemmata Schmelz, Chen & Józefowska, 2024
- Achaeta gigantea Dózsa-Farkas, 2000
- Achaeta giustii Rota, 2015
- Achaeta hallensis Möller, 1976
- Achaeta hanagarthi Schmelz, 2008
- Achaeta iberica Graefe, 1989
- Achaeta indica Prabhoo, 1960
- Achaeta iridescens Christoffersen, 1979
- Achaeta koreana Dózsa-Farkas, Felföldi, Nagy & Hong, 2018
- Achaeta littoralis Lasserre, 1968
- Achaeta macroampullacea Dózsa-Farkas, Felföldi, Nagy & Hong, 2018
- Achaeta macrocyta Christensen & Dózsa-Farkas, 1999
- Achaeta maorica Benham, 1903
- Achaeta matritensis Sesma & Dózsa-Farkas, 1993
- Achaeta minima Southern, 1907
- Achaeta multisacculata Dózsa-Farkas, Felföldi, Nagy & Hong, 2019
- Achaeta neotropica Černosvitov, 1937
- Achaeta nielseni Prabhoo, 1960
- Achaeta pannonica Graefe, 1989
- Achaeta paranensis Schmelz, 2008
- Achaeta parva Nielsen & Christensen, 1961
- Achaeta pigmentosa Christensen & Dózsa-Farkas, 2007
- Achaeta piti Bittencourt, 1974
- Achaeta segmentata Prabhoo, 1966
- Achaeta seminalis Kasprzak, 1972
- Achaeta singularis Schmelz, 2008
- Achaeta tothi Dózsa-Farkas & Felföldi, 2017
- Achaeta unibulba Graefe, Dózsa-Farkas & Christensen, 2005
- Achaeta urbana Heck & Römbke, 1991
- Achaeta vejdovskyi Bretscher, 1902
