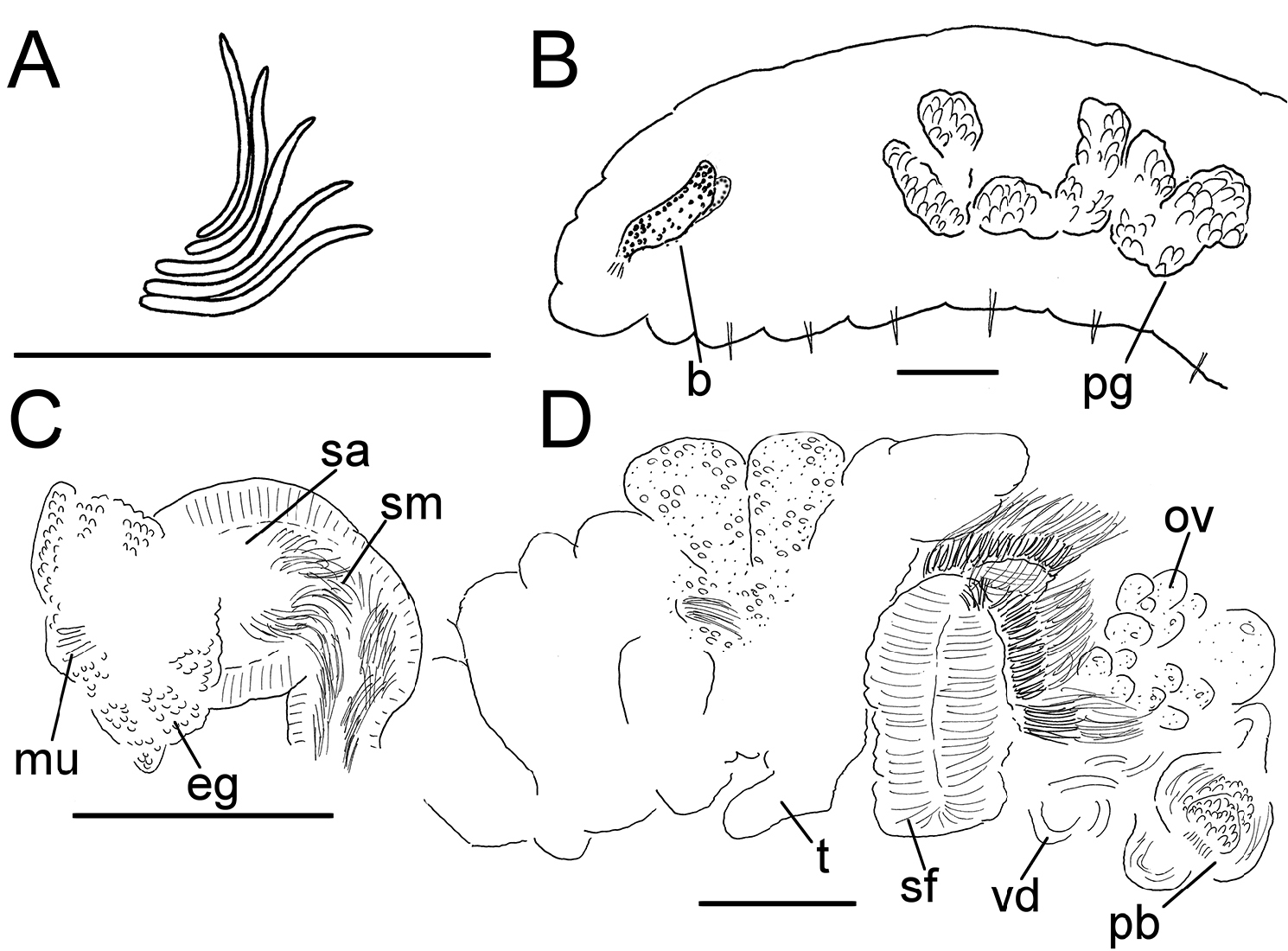
- Depiction of various anatomical features of Lumbricillus

Scientific classification
- Domain: Eukaryota
- Kingdom: Animalia
- Phylum: Annelida
- Clade: Pleistoannelida
- Clade: Sedentaria
- Class: Clitellata
- Order: Tubificida
- Family: Enchytraeidae
- Genus: Lumbricillus; Ørsted, 1844

= Lumbricillus =

Genus of annelids

Lumbricillus is a genus of annelids belonging to the family Enchytraeidae.

The genus has cosmopolitan distribution.

Species:

- Lumbricillus aestuum (Stephenson, 1932)
- Lumbricillus alaricus Shurova, 1974
