= Grania =

Scientific classification
- Domain: Eukaryota
- Kingdom: Animalia
- Phylum: Annelida
- Clade: Pleistoannelida
- Clade: Sedentaria
- Class: Clitellata
- Order: Tubificida
- Family: Enchytraeidae
- Genus: Grania; Southern, 1913

Synonyms
- Hemigrania Lasserre, 1971

Genus of annelids

Grania is a genus of marine annelid worms in the class Clitellata. They are found at many depths in sands throughout the world. They are generally about 2 centimetres (0.79 in) in length and mostly colorless or white, though Grania colorata, a recently discovered species found in the Great Barrier Reef, is green.

== Species ==
There are 72 species in the genus Grania which have been identified. They include:

- Grania acanthochaeta Rota & Erséus, 1996
- Grania algida Rota & Erséus, 1996
- Grania alliata Coates & Stacey, 1993
- Grania americana Kennedy, 1966
- Grania angustinasus Rota & Erséus, 1996
- Grania antarctica Rota & Erséus, 1996
- Grania aquitana Rota & Erseus, 2003
- Grania ascophora Coates, 1990
- Grania atlantica Coates & Erséus, 1985
- Grania bekkouchei Prantoni, De Wit & Erséus, 2016
- Grania bermudensis Erséus & Lasserre, 1976

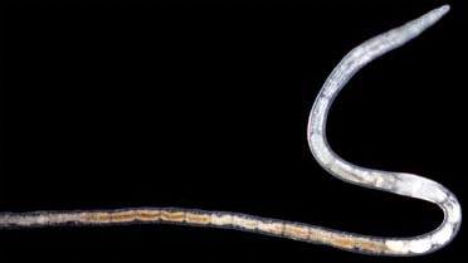
An individual of an undescribed Chilean species of Grania (Photo by Pierre De Wit)

- Grania brasiliensis Prantoni, De Wit & Erséus, 2016
- Grania breviductus De Wit, Rota & Erséus, 2009
- Grania bykane Coates, 1990
- Grania canaria Rota & Erseus, 2003
- Grania capensis Prantoni, De Wit & Erséus, 2016
- Grania carchinii Rota & Erséus, 1996
- Grania carolinensis Prantoni, De Wit & Erséus, 2016
- Grania cinctura De Wit & Erséus, 2007
- Grania chilensis Prantoni, De Wit & Erséus, 2016
- Grania colorata De Wit, Rota & Erséus, 2009
- Grania conjuncta Coates & Stacey, 1993
- Grania crassiducta Coates, 1990
- Grania curta De Wit & Erséus, 2007
- Grania cryptica Prantoni, De Wit & Erséus, 2016
- Grania darwinensis Coates & Stacey, 1997)
- Grania dolichura Rota & Erséus, 2000
- Grania ersei Coates, 1990
- Grania euristila Coates & Stacey, 1997
- Grania fiscellata De Wit & Erséus, 2007
- Grania fortunata Rota & Erseus, 2003
- Grania fustata De Wit & Erséus, 2007
- Grania galbina De Wit & Erséus, 2007
- Grania hastula Coates, 1990
- Grania hinojosai Prantoni, De Wit & Erséus, 2016
- Grania hirsuticauda Rota & Erséus, 1996
- Grania homochaeta De Wit, Rota & Erséus, 2009
- Grania hongkongensis Erséus, 1990
- Grania hylae Locke & Coates, 1999
- Grania hyperoadenia Coates, 1990
- Grania incerta Coates & Erséus, 1980
- Grania inermis Erséus, 1990
- Grania integra Coates & Stacey, 1997
- Grania lasserrei Rota & Erséus, 1997
- Grania laxarta Locke & Coates, 1999
- Grania levis Coates, 1985
- Grania longiducta Erséus & Lasserre, 1976
- Grania longistyla Coates & Stacey, 1993
- Grania macrochaeta Pierantoni, 1901)
- Grania mangeri Michaelsen, 1914)
- Grania maricola Southern, 1913
- Grania mauretanica Rota & Erseus, 2003
- Grania mira Locke & Coates, 1998
- Grania monochaeta Michaelsen, 1888)
- Grania monospermatheca Erséus & Lasserre, 1976
- Grania novacaledonia De Wit & Erséus, 2007
- Grania ocarina Rota, Erséus & Wang, 2003
- Grania occulta De Wit & Erséus, 2010
- Grania ovitheca Erséus, 1977
- Grania pacifica Shurova, 1979
- Grania papillata De Wit & Erséus, 2007
- Grania papillinasus Rota & Erseus, 2003
- Grania parvitheca Erséus, 1980
- Grania paucispina Eisen, 1904)
- Grania postclitellochaeta Knöllner, 1935)
- Grania principissae Michaelsen, 1907)
- Grania pusilla Erséus, 1974
- Grania quaerens Rota, Wang & Erséus, 2007
- Grania reducta Coates, 1985
- Grania regina De Wit, Rota & Erséus, 2009
- Grania roscoffensis Lasserre, 1967
- Grania simonae Prantoni, De Wit & Erséus, 2016
- Grania sperantia Rota, Wang & Erséus, 2007
- Grania stephensoniana Rota & Erséus, 1997
- Grania stilifera Erséus, 1990
- Grania tasmaniae Rota & Erséus, 2000
- Grania torosa Rota & Erseus, 2003
- Grania trichaeta Jamieson, 1977
- Grania unitheca Prantoni, De Wit & Erséus, 2016
- Grania vacivasa Coates & Stacey, 1993
- Grania variochaeta Erséus & Lasserre, 1976
- Grania vikinga Rota & Erseus, 2003
