= Hope Nakazibwe Grania =

Ugandan politician, and laboratory scientist (born 1986)

Hon. Hope Nakazibwe Grania
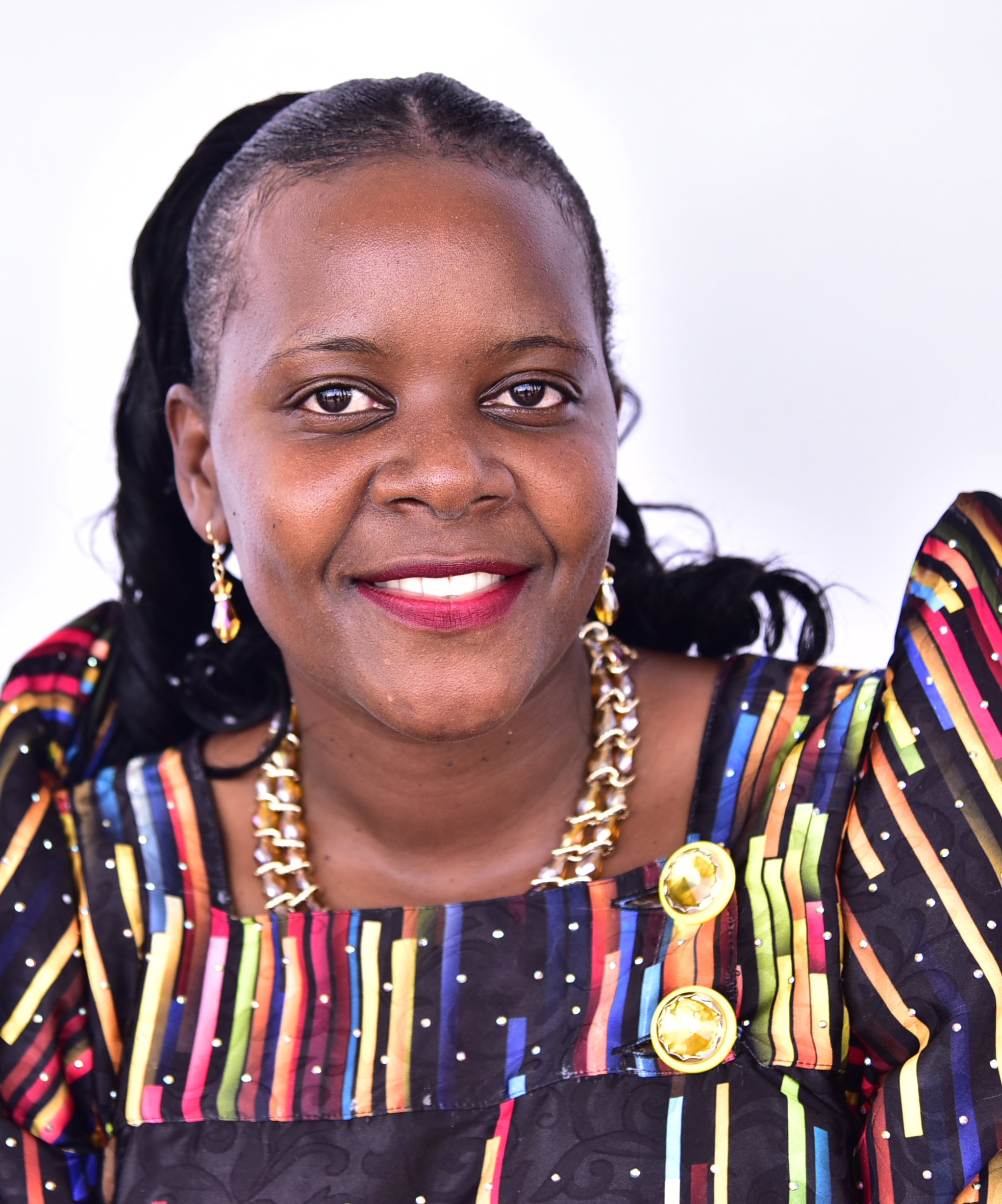

Woman Member of Parliament for Mubende District
- Incumbent
- Assumed office 2021
- Constituency: Mubende District

Secretary General of the Uganda Women Parliamentary Association

Deputy Chairperson of the Parliamentary Committee on Agriculture, Animal Industry and Fisheries

Personal details
- Born: 20 January 1986 (age 40) Mubende District, Uganda
- Citizenship: Uganda
- Party: National Resistance Movement
- Spouse: Andrew Abaasa
- Parent(s): Hindia Mpuuga and Norah Mbabazi
- Education: Tiger Army Primary School; Kasenyi Secondary School; Christ the King Bulinda
- Alma mater: Makerere Paramedical School Mulago; Mbarara University of Science and Technology; Uganda Martyrs University; University of California, San Francisco
- Occupation: Politician, laboratory scientist
- Profession: Medical laboratory scientist
- Known for: Representing Mubende District in Parliament and her background in medical laboratory science

Hope Nakazibwe Grania (born 20 January 1986) is a Ugandan politician, and laboratory scientist. She is the current woman member of parliament Mubende District. Hope is married to Dr Andrew Abaasa.

== Early life and education ==
Hope Nakazibwe was born on 20 January 1986, to Hindia Mpuuga and Norah Mbabazi of Mubende District. She attended Tiger Army primary School in Mubende District for elementary education in 1999, Kasenyi SS in Mubende for her ordinary education and Christ the King Bulinda for her advanced level education. She holds a diploma in medical laboratory science from Makerere Paramedical School Mulago (2008).

She also holds a bachelor's degree in medical laboratory sciences from Mbarara University of Science and Technology where she won a convocational award as the best student of 2012. She also holds a master of public health from Uganda Martyrs University and a Certificate in Biomedical scientific manuscript writing from the University of California, San Francisco.

== Career ==
Hope served as a laboratory technologist at Mengo Hospital in 2008. Between 2009-2010, she worked as a laboratory field supervisor in Integrated Community Based Initiatives (ICOBI) in Mubende and Kassanda districts. She also worked as a laboratory supervisor ICOBI Kampala central division in 2013. She joined Uganda Virus Research Institute /Medical Research Council and London School of Hygiene and Tropical Medicine in 2013, leading; the hematology department 2013-2015, Biochemistry 2015-2016, Molecular 2017-2020 and Joined active politics in 2020.

== Political career ==
In 2020, she contested for Mubende District Women's Constituency on the National Resistance Movement political party ticket where she defeated Benna Namugwanya, the former State Minister in charge of Kampala Capital City Authority (KCCA). She has represented that constituency in the 11th Parliament of Uganda until today. On January 15th, 2026, she was re-elected on NRM ticket to the 12th parliament (2026-2031) of Uganda with over 70,000 votes defeating three other candidates that combined polled about 50% of her votes. She also serves as the Secretary General in the Uganda Women Parliamentary Association, She is also the NRM party parliamentary whip for greater Mubende. She is the deputy chairperson of the parliamentary committee on Agriculture, Animal Industry and Fisheries.
