= Stephensoniella (annelid) =

Scientific classification
- Domain: Eukaryota
- Kingdom: Animalia
- Phylum: Annelida
- Clade: Pleistoannelida
- Clade: Sedentaria
- Class: Clitellata
- Order: Tubificida
- Family: Enchytraeidae
- Genus: Stephensoniella; Cernosvitov, 1934

Genus of annelid worms

Stephensoniella is a genus of annelid worms within the family Enchytraeidae. Members of this genus can be found in North America, South America, Asia, and Australia.

== Species ==
- Stephensoniella marina (Moore, 1902)
- Stephensoniella sterreri (Lasserre & Erséus, 1976)
- Stephensoniella trevori (Coates, 1980)
