= Jeff Anderson (snowboarder) =

American snowboarder (1979–2003)

Jeff Anderson (November 2, 1979 – February 23, 2003) was an American professional snowboarder known for his contributions to the sport during the late 1990s and early 2000s. Originally from Mammoth Lakes, California, Anderson transitioned from skiing to snowboarding in his youth and gained recognition in the snowboarding community. He was a member of the Burton crew, a team noted for its influence in snowboarding. Anderson was recognized for his technical skills, including the frontside 450 on, 270 out on rails, and his performance in the 2003 film Kingpins Back in Black.

== Death and tributes ==
Anderson died at the age of 23 in an accident from a fall in Japan, which had a notable impact on the snowboarding community. After his death, his friends and family started the JLA Project. The project created the Volcom Brothers Skate Park in Mammoth Lakes. The first event was at Mammoth Mountain Ski Area in 2016.
