= Snow algae =

Group of alpine and polar freshwater algae

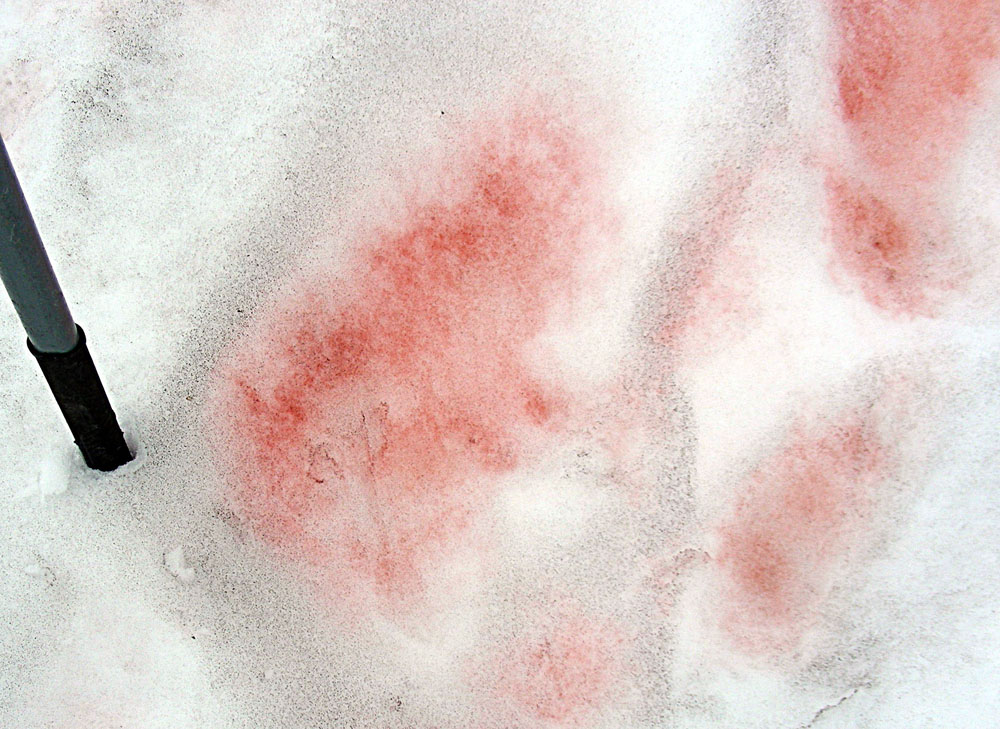
An example of snow algae

Snow algae are a group of freshwater micro-algae that grow in the alpine and polar regions of the Earth. Snow algae have been found on every continent but are restricted to areas with temperatures of 0–10 °C. Snow algae are pigmented by chlorophyll and carotenoids and can be a variety of colors depending on the individual species, life stage, and topography/geography. The pigmentation of snow algae reduces snow and ice albedo, which can stimulate the melting of perennial snow and ice and exacerbate the effects of climate change. Snow algae are primary producers that form the basis of communities on snow or ice sheets that include microbes, tardigrades, and rotifers. Snow algae have also been carried great distances by winds.

== Pigmentation ==
Snow algae produce two main classes of pigment molecules: chlorophylls and carotenoids. Carotenoids further split into two groups known as primary and secondary carotenoids and giving the snow-algae cells their visible colors. Primary carotenoids, such as the yellow xanthophyll, are typically used in low concentrations for photosynthesis while still offering some UV protection. Secondary carotenoids, such as the red astaxanthin, are used for antioxidative stress protection by the cell and can be found in high or low concentrations depending on the light intensity.

Different taxa of snow algae produce differing amounts of primary and secondary carotenoids, meaning the color of a snow algae bloom can give some indication of the composition of algae found there. The alga Sanguina is a very abundant genus of red blooms with high concentrations of astaxanthin and its derivatives. Many Chloromonas species are associated with green or orange-yellow snow due to the primary carotenoids they produce. Similar colors of snow can also vary in composition by region, showing large-scale biogeographical trends in the snow-algae distribution.

== Role in ecosystem ==
Snow algae undergo oxygenic photosynthesis and are primary producers on the snow. This allows other organisms to live on the snow along with the algae and feed on them to obtain energy. Tardigrades and rotifers have been shown to grow preferentially on green blooms but have been found on many different snow algae blooms across the globe.

Although the trophic webs of snow-algae blooms are not generally complex, the microbial communities found in these blooms can play major roles in how nutrients are distributed in the environments they inhabit. These microbial and algal communities cycle globally significant amounts of carbon, nitrogen, iron, and sulfur.

== Effects on snow albedo and climate change ==
The pigmentation of snow algae can significantly reduce snow albedo, stimulating the melting of ice and snow on ice sheets. Larger snow grains allow light to penetrate further into the snow layer, which increases light absorbance by snow algae and further reduces the albedo of the snow. Snow algae drive greater changes in snow albedo later in the summer when algae are more abundant. The different abundances of pigments present in snow algae, including chlorophyll and carotenoids, lead to differences in light absorption and therefore albedo changes based on algal community composition. The presence of mineral and organic particle impurities on snow also reduces the albedo of snow, which can sometimes overshadow the effects of snow-algal community dynamics on the albedo. Under warmer conditions, snow algae experience more growth, which can further reduce the albedo of snow and ice sheets. This positive feedback loop, similar to the ice-albedo feedback, can exacerbate the melting of perennial snow and ice by climate change.
