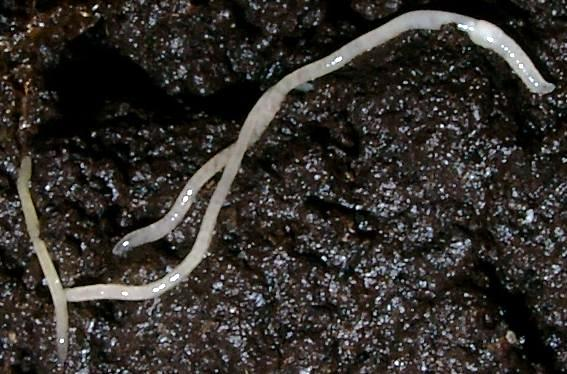

Scientific classification
- Kingdom: Animalia
- Phylum: Annelida
- Clade: Pleistoannelida
- Clade: Sedentaria
- Class: Clitellata
- Order: Enchytraeida
- Family: Enchytraeidae; Vejdovský, 1879

= Enchytraeidae =

Family of annelids

Enchytraeidae is a family of microdrile oligochaetes. They resemble small earthworms and include both terrestrial species known as potworms that live in highly organic terrestrial environments, as well as some that are marine. More than 700 species in about 30 genera have been described worldwide, although the true diversity of the family is thought to be much higher. Most species are small, whitish or transparent worms only a few millimetres long that feed on decaying organic matter and the microorganisms colonizing it, making them important contributors to decomposition and nutrient cycling in soils. The peculiar genus Mesenchytraeus is known as "ice worms", as they spend the majority of their lives within glaciers, only rising to the surface at certain points in the summer. Enchytraeidae also includes the Grindal worm (Enchytraeus buchholzi), which is commercially bred as aquarium fish food. Certain varieties of Enchytraeidae are partially responsible for the notorious "dark earth" archaeological layers in post-Roman Era British urban centers such as London.

Enchytraeids, like earthworms, are ecosystem engineers, influencing the soil structure by creating aggregates of various sizes. Negative interactions between potworms and earthworms have been experimentally registered, and observed in the field when a wide array of Land use types were considered. These interactions could be explained by different environmental optima, e.g. microclimate, pH and nutrient availability, texture, potentially reinforced by competition. Enchytraeids are less sensitive than earthworms to agricultural intensification and replace them in soils with heavy pesticide use. However, positive interactions between these two oligochaete groups have also been observed in microcosm experiments. Enchytraeids have been shown to feed on earthworm excrements (earthworm casts) which they pulverize and transform into fluffy masses of their own excrements (enchytraeid faeces), which form the bulk of Moder humus OH horizons.

Enchytraeids are now commonly used in ecotoxicity tests such as the enchytraeid reproduction test (ERT) guideline ISO 16387.

== Genera ==
Enchytraeidae contains the following genera:

- Achaeta Vejdovský, 1878
- Aspidodrilus Baylis, 1914
- Barbidrilus Loden & Locy, 1980
- Bryodrilus Ude, 1892
- Buchholzia Michaelsen, 1886
- Cernosvitoviella Nielsen & Christensen, 1959 Genus Christensenidrilus Dózsa-Farkas & Convey, 1998
- Claparedrilus Klinth, Rota & Erséus, 2017
- Cognettia Nielsen & Christensen, 1959
- Decimodrilus Dózsa-Farkas, Nagy, Felföldi & Hong, 2019
- Enchylea Nielsen & Christensen, 1963
- Enchytraeina von Bülow, 1957
- Enchytraeus Henle, 1837
- Enchytronia Nielsen & Christensen, 1959
- Euenchytraeus Bretscher, 1906
- Fridericia Michaelsen, 1889
- Globulidrilus Christensen & Dózsa-Farkas, 2012
- Grania Southern, 1913
- Guaranidrilus Černosvitov, 1937
- Hemienchytraeus Černosvitov, 1934
- Hemifridericia Nielsen & Christensen, 1959
- Henlea Michaelsen, 1889
- Isosetosa Xu, D-M. Zhang & J-M. Jiang, 1989
- Lumbricillus Ørsted, 1844
- Marionina Michaelsen in Pfeffer, 1890
- Mesenchytraeus Eisen, 1878
- Neoenchytraeus Eisen, 1878
- Oconnorella Rota, 1995
- Paralumbricillus Klinth & Rota, 2024 in Klinth et al, 2024
- Pelmatodrilus J.P. Moore, 1943
- Randidrilus Coates & Erséus, 1985
- Sinenchytraeus Liang & Hsü, 1979
- Stephensoniella Cernosvitov, 1934
- Stercutus Michaelsen, 1888
- Tupidrilus Righi, 1974
- Xetadrilus Schmelz, Collado & Römbke, 2011
