= Wilhelm Michaelsen =

German zoologist (1860–1937)

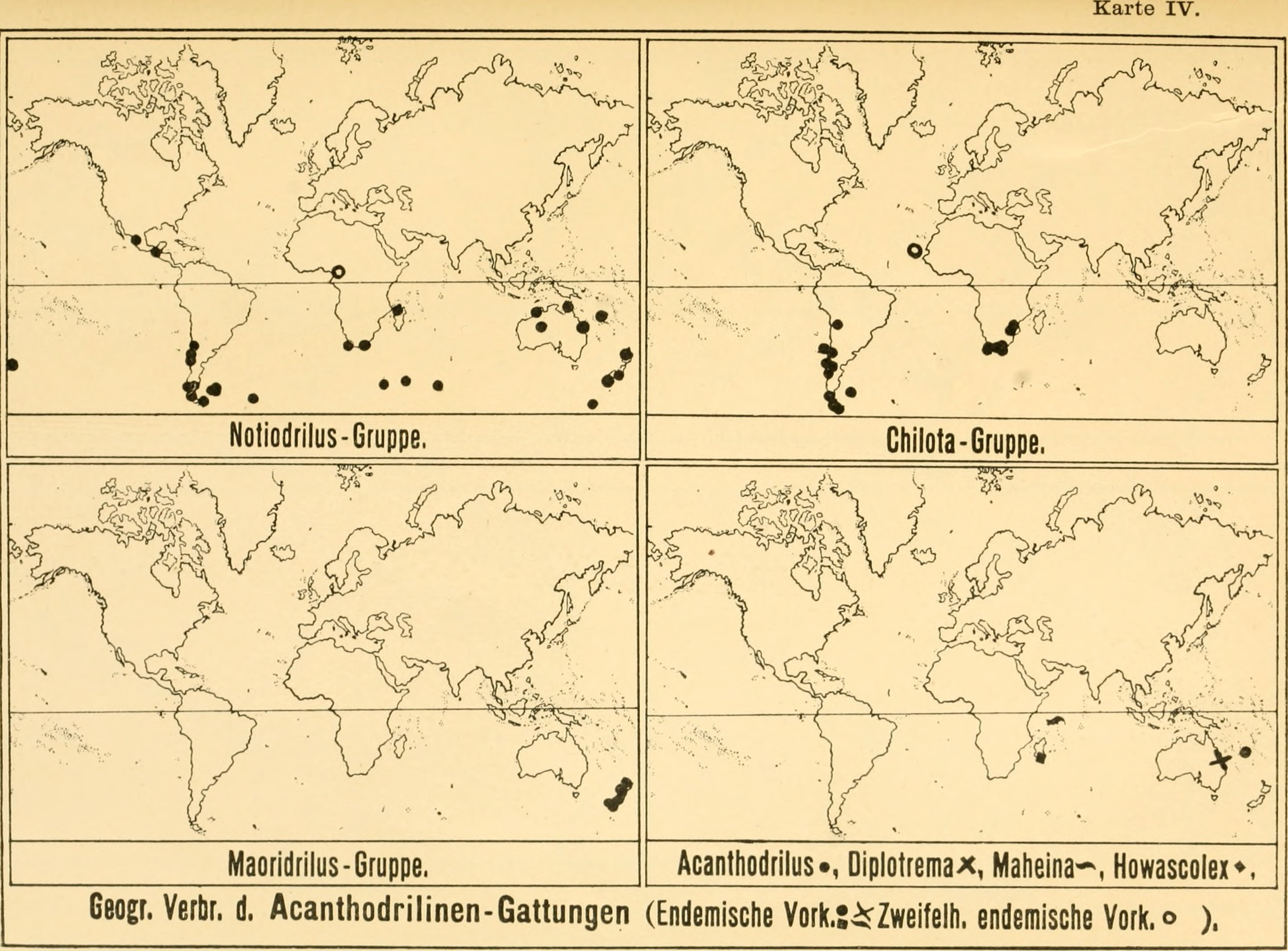
Die geographische Verbreitung der Oligochaeten (1903)

Johann Wilhelm Michaelsen (9 October 1860, Hamburg - 18 February 1937) was a German zoologist who was a world authority on the Oligochaeta which includes the earthworms. He named and described more than a thousand new species.

Michaelsen was born to Friedrich Rudolph and Johanna Catharina Ferdinandine née Köhn. In 1887 he commenced work at the Hamburg Zoological Museum, at first as a research assistant. He was later to become Hauptkustos (chief curator). Alfred Lothar Wegener (1880-1930) was a friend of Michaelsen and made use of his biogeographical work for some of his ideas on plate tectonics. Michaelsen named a species of earthworm after him as Wegeneriella Michaelsen, 1933. He also collaborated with John Stephenson.

Though he also worked in the study of Tunicates and Polychaetes, Michaelsen was best known for his work on Oligochaeta. To that end, he travelled to southern regions of South America, Africa and Australia to investigate the fossil records of ancient Oligochaete distribution.

Michaelsen was married to Agnes Huwald and they had no children.

Michaelsen is commemorated in the scientific name of a species of lizard, Strophurus michaelseni.
