= Enchytraeida =

Scientific classification
- Kingdom: Animalia
- Phylum: Annelida
- Clade: Pleistoannelida
- Clade: Sedentaria
- Class: Clitellata
- Subclass: Oligochaeta
- Order: Enchytraeida

Order of annelid worms

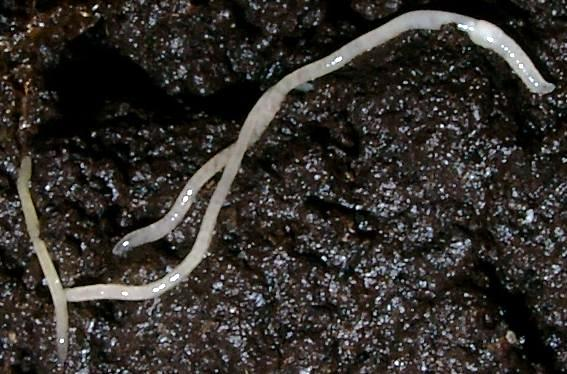
Three Enchytraeus albidui

Enchytraeida is an order of annelids belonging to the class Clitellata.

Families:

- Enchytraeidae
- Propappidae
