= Rhyacodrilinae =

Scientific classification
- Domain: Eukaryota
- Kingdom: Animalia
- Phylum: Annelida
- Clade: Pleistoannelida
- Clade: Sedentaria
- Class: Clitellata
- Order: Tubificida
- Family: Naididae
- Subfamily: Rhyacodrilinae; Hrabe, 1963

Genera
- See text

Subfamily of annelid

Rhyacodrilinae is a subfamily of clitellate oligochaete worms in the family Naididae.

== Species ==
The World Register of Marine Species recognizes the following genera in the subfamily Rhyacodrilinae:

- Ainudrilus Finogenova, 1982
- Bothrioneurum Stolc, 1886
- Epirodrilus Hrabĕ, 1930
- Heronidrilus Erséus & Jamieson, 1981
- Heterodrilus Pierantoni, 1902
- Hrabeus Semernoy, 2004
- Jolydrilus Er. Marcus, 1965
- Macquaridrilus Jamieson, 1968
- Monopylephorus Levinsen, 1884
- Moraviodrilus Hrabě, 1935
- Paranadrilus Gavrilov, 1955
- Pararhyacodrilus Snimschikova, 1986
- Paupidrilus Erséus, 1990
- Peristodrilus Baker & Brinkhurst, 1981
- Protuberodrilus Giani & Martinez-Ansemil, 1979
- Rhizodrilus Smith, 1900
- Rhyacodrilus Bretscher, 1901
- Svetlovia Čekanovskaya, 1975
- Torodrilus Cook, 1970
