= Limnodriloides sacculus =

Scientific classification
- Kingdom: Animalia
- Phylum: Annelida
- Clade: Pleistoannelida
- Clade: Sedentaria
- Class: Clitellata
- Order: Tubificida
- Family: Naididae
- Genus: Limnodriloides
- Species: L. sacculus

Binomial name
- Limnodriloides sacculus Erséus, 1990

Species of annelid

Limnodriloides sacculus is a species of clitellate oligochaete worm, first found in Belize, on the Caribbean side of Central America.
