= Inanidrilus scalprum =

Scientific classification
- Domain: Eukaryota
- Kingdom: Animalia
- Phylum: Annelida
- Clade: Pleistoannelida
- Clade: Sedentaria
- Class: Clitellata
- Order: Tubificida
- Family: Naididae
- Genus: Inanidrilus
- Species: I. scalprum

Binomial name
- Inanidrilus scalprum Erséus, 1984

Species of annelid

Inanidrilus scalprum is a species of annelid worm. It is known from subtidal coral sands in Belize, in the Caribbean Sea. Preserved specimens measure 7.1–8.3 mm (0.28–0.33 in) in length.
