= Inanidrilus wasseri =

Scientific classification
- Domain: Eukaryota
- Kingdom: Animalia
- Phylum: Annelida
- Clade: Pleistoannelida
- Clade: Sedentaria
- Class: Clitellata
- Order: Tubificida
- Family: Naididae
- Genus: Inanidrilus
- Species: I. wasseri

Binomial name
- Inanidrilus wasseri Erséus, 1984

Species of annelid

Inanidrilus wasseri is a species of annelid worm. It is known from subtidal sands near the Lizard Island in the northern part of the Great Barrier Reef. Preserved specimens measure 14.1–17.5 mm (0.56–0.69 in) in length. The specific name wasseri honours Mr Robert Wasser, a maintenance officer at the Lizard Island Research Station.
