= Inanidrilus gustavsoni =

Scientific classification
- Domain: Eukaryota
- Kingdom: Animalia
- Phylum: Annelida
- Clade: Pleistoannelida
- Clade: Sedentaria
- Class: Clitellata
- Order: Tubificida
- Family: Naididae
- Genus: Inanidrilus
- Species: I. gustavsoni

Binomial name
- Inanidrilus gustavsoni Erséus, 1984

Species of annelid

Inanidrilus gustavsoni is a species of annelid worm. It is known from subtidal coral sands in the Bellairs Reef, Barbados, in the Atlantic Ocean. It measures 7.5–10.9 mm (0.30–0.43 in) in length.
