= Inanidrilus renaudae =

Scientific classification
- Domain: Eukaryota
- Kingdom: Animalia
- Phylum: Annelida
- Clade: Pleistoannelida
- Clade: Sedentaria
- Class: Clitellata
- Order: Tubificida
- Family: Naididae
- Genus: Inanidrilus
- Species: I. renaudae

Binomial name
- Inanidrilus renaudae Erséus, 1984

Species of annelid

Inanidrilus renaudae is a species of annelid worms. It is known from subtidal coralline sands in Îlet à Fajou, Guadeloupe, the Caribbean.
