= Inanidrilus bulbosus =

Scientific classification
- Domain: Eukaryota
- Kingdom: Animalia
- Phylum: Annelida
- Clade: Pleistoannelida
- Clade: Sedentaria
- Class: Clitellata
- Order: Tubificida
- Family: Naididae
- Genus: Inanidrilus
- Species: I. bulbosus

Binomial name
- Inanidrilus bulbosus Erséus, 1979

Species of annelid

Inanidrilus bulbosus is a species of annelid worm. It is known from subtidal sands in the Atlantic coast of Florida.
