= Inanidrilus speroi =

Scientific classification
- Domain: Eukaryota
- Kingdom: Animalia
- Phylum: Annelida
- Clade: Pleistoannelida
- Clade: Sedentaria
- Class: Clitellata
- Order: Tubificida
- Family: Naididae
- Genus: Inanidrilus
- Species: I. speroi

Binomial name
- Inanidrilus speroi Erséus, 1984

Species of annelid

Inanidrilus speroi is a species of annelid worm. It is known from subtidal carbonate sands in the Bellairs Reef, Barbados, in the Atlantic Ocean. Preserved specimens measure 4.1–9.2 mm (0.16–0.36 in) in length.
