= Smithsonidrilus appositus =

Scientific classification
- Kingdom: Animalia
- Phylum: Annelida
- Clade: Pleistoannelida
- Clade: Sedentaria
- Class: Clitellata
- Order: Tubificida
- Family: Naididae
- Genus: Smithsonidrilus
- Species: S. appositus

Binomial name
- Smithsonidrilus appositus Erséus, 1990

Species of annelid

Smithsonidrilus appositus is a species of oligochaete worm, first found in Belize, on the Caribbean side of Central America.
