= Inanidrilus extremus =

Scientific classification
- Domain: Eukaryota
- Kingdom: Animalia
- Phylum: Annelida
- Clade: Pleistoannelida
- Clade: Sedentaria
- Class: Clitellata
- Order: Tubificida
- Family: Naididae
- Genus: Inanidrilus
- Species: I. extremus

Binomial name
- Inanidrilus extremus (Erséus, 1979)

Species of annelid

Inanidrilus extremus is a species of annelid worm. It is known from subtidal coarse coral sands in the Atlantic coast of Florida.
