= Inanidrilus vacivus =

Scientific classification
- Domain: Eukaryota
- Kingdom: Animalia
- Phylum: Annelida
- Clade: Pleistoannelida
- Clade: Sedentaria
- Class: Clitellata
- Order: Tubificida
- Family: Naididae
- Genus: Inanidrilus
- Species: I. vacivus

Binomial name
- Inanidrilus vacivus Erséus, 1984

Species of annelid

Inanidrilus vacivus is a species of annelid worm. It is known from subtidal zone of the Atlantic coast of Florida in the Hutchinson Island. Preserved specimens measure 7.1–8.2 mm (0.28–0.32 in) in length.
