= Inanidrilus falcifer =

Scientific classification
- Kingdom: Animalia
- Phylum: Annelida
- Clade: Pleistoannelida
- Clade: Sedentaria
- Class: Clitellata
- Order: Tubificida
- Family: Naididae
- Genus: Inanidrilus
- Species: I. falcifer

Binomial name
- Inanidrilus falcifer Erséus & Baker, 1982

Species of annelid

Inanidrilus falcifer is a species of annelid worm. It is known from subtidal silty coral sands on the Caribbean side of Barbados, in the Atlantic Ocean.
