= Smithsonidrilus multiglandularis =

Scientific classification
- Kingdom: Animalia
- Phylum: Annelida
- Clade: Pleistoannelida
- Clade: Sedentaria
- Class: Clitellata
- Order: Tubificida
- Family: Naididae
- Genus: Smithsonidrilus
- Species: S. multiglandularis

Binomial name
- Smithsonidrilus multiglandularis Erséus, 1990

Species of annelid

Smithsonidrilus multiglandularis is a species of oligochaete worms, first found in Puerto Rico and Florida.
