= Limnodrilus =

Scientific classification
- Kingdom: Animalia
- Phylum: Annelida
- Clade: Pleistoannelida
- Clade: Sedentaria
- Class: Clitellata
- Order: Tubificida
- Family: Naididae
- Subfamily: Tubificinae
- Genus: Limnodrilus; Claparède, 1862

Genus of annelid worms

Limnodrilus is a genus of Naididae.

The genus was described in 1862 by René-Édouard Claparède.

It has cosmopolitan distribution.

Species:

- Limnodrilus amblysetus (Brinkhurst, Qi & Liang, 1990)
- Limnodrilus bogdanowii (Grimm, 1876)
- Limnodrilus bulbiphallus (Block & Goodnight, 1972)
- Limnodrilus cervix (Brinkhurst, 1963)
- Limnodrilus claparedianus (Ratzel, 1868)
- Limnodrilus dybowskii (Grube, 1873)
- Limnodrilus grandisetosus (Nomura, 1932)
- Limnodrilus hoffmeisteri (Claparède, 1862)
- Limnodrilus maumeensis (Brinkhurst & Cook, 1966)
- Limnodrilus neotropicus (Černosvitov, 1939)
- Limnodrilus nitens (Semernoy, 1982)
- Limnodrilus paramblysetus (Wang & Liang, 2001)
- Limnodrilus profundicola (Verrill, 1871)
- Limnodrilus rubripenis (Loden, 1977)
- Limnodrilus silvani (Eisen, 1879)
- Limnodrilus simplex (He, Cui & Wang, 2010)
- Limnodrilus sulphurensis (Fend, Liu & Erséus, 2016)
- Limnodrilus tendens (Semernoy, 1982)
- Limnodrilus tortilipenis (Wetzel, 1987)
- Limnodrilus udekemianus (Claparède, 1862)
