= Inanidrilus fijiensis =

Scientific classification
- Domain: Eukaryota
- Kingdom: Animalia
- Phylum: Annelida
- Clade: Pleistoannelida
- Clade: Sedentaria
- Class: Clitellata
- Order: Tubificida
- Family: Naididae
- Genus: Inanidrilus
- Species: I. fijiensis

Binomial name
- Inanidrilus fijiensis Erséus, 1984

Species of annelid worm

Inanidrilus fijiensis is a species of annelid worm.
