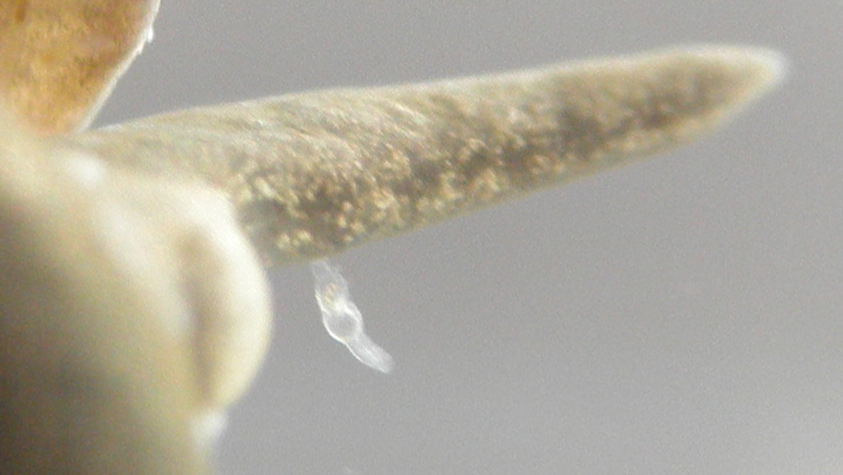
- Chaetogaster limnaei limnaei on a tentacle of Lymnaea stagnalis

Scientific classification
- Kingdom: Animalia
- Phylum: Annelida
- Clade: Pleistoannelida
- Clade: Sedentaria
- Class: Clitellata
- Order: Tubificida
- Family: Naididae
- Subfamily: Naidinae
- Genus: Chaetogaster von Baer, 1827

Species
- Chaetogaster cristallinus Chaetogaster diaphanous Chaetogaster diversisetosus Chaetogaster krasnopolskiae Chaetogaster langi Chaetogaster limnaei Chaetogaster parvus Chaetogaster setosus Chaetogaster annandalei

= Chaetogaster =

Genus of annelid worms

Chaetogaster is a genus belonging to the segmented worms (Annelida). It is classified in the family Naididae (subfamily Naidinae) in the order Oligochaeta. These are ca. 2–25 mm long transparent worms that are very common in fresh water and often form chains of individuals through asexual multiplication.

== Morphology ==
Externally, the animals correspond to the general building plan of the Naididae, however, in distinction from the other species, they bear setae (bristles) only on their ventral side, which is what gives them their name. The size of the worms, and of their setae too, is very variable even within single species.

== Distribution and feeding ==
These worms occur mostly in stagnant or flowing freshwater, but the largest species, Chaetogaster diaphanus, also lives in brackish water. All species seem to be widely distributed within Europe and in addition, many species are found on multiple continents.

Full body micrograph

The animals are usually very active but cannot swim purposefully. They therefore live on solid substrates like plants, stones and in the case of one subspecies (Chaetogaster limnaei limnaei), on snails or (occasionally) mussels. They feed by sucking in small organisms of adequate size. The composition of the food items differs between species, as the size of the sucked in food components depends on each species' body size. While the biggest species Ch. diaphanus consumes organisms in the size class of about 0.3–3 mm, which mostly contains zooplankton (rotifers, water fleas etc.), Ch. limnaei e.g. selects organisms in the order of 0.03-0.3 mm, which are mainly algae (diatoms and green algae) or very small zooplankton. In principle, all species are therefore omnivores, the bigger species taking in mainly animal food and the smaller ones rather plant particles. The unselective nature of their feeding is clearly shown by the fact that sand grains and other indigestible particles (e.g. conifer pollen) are always found in their stomachs. These particles are also in the indicated size range.

Physiologically, the Chaetogaster species have already long been known as invertebrates with acid stomach content, just like vertebrates.

== The special case of Chaetogaster limnaei ==
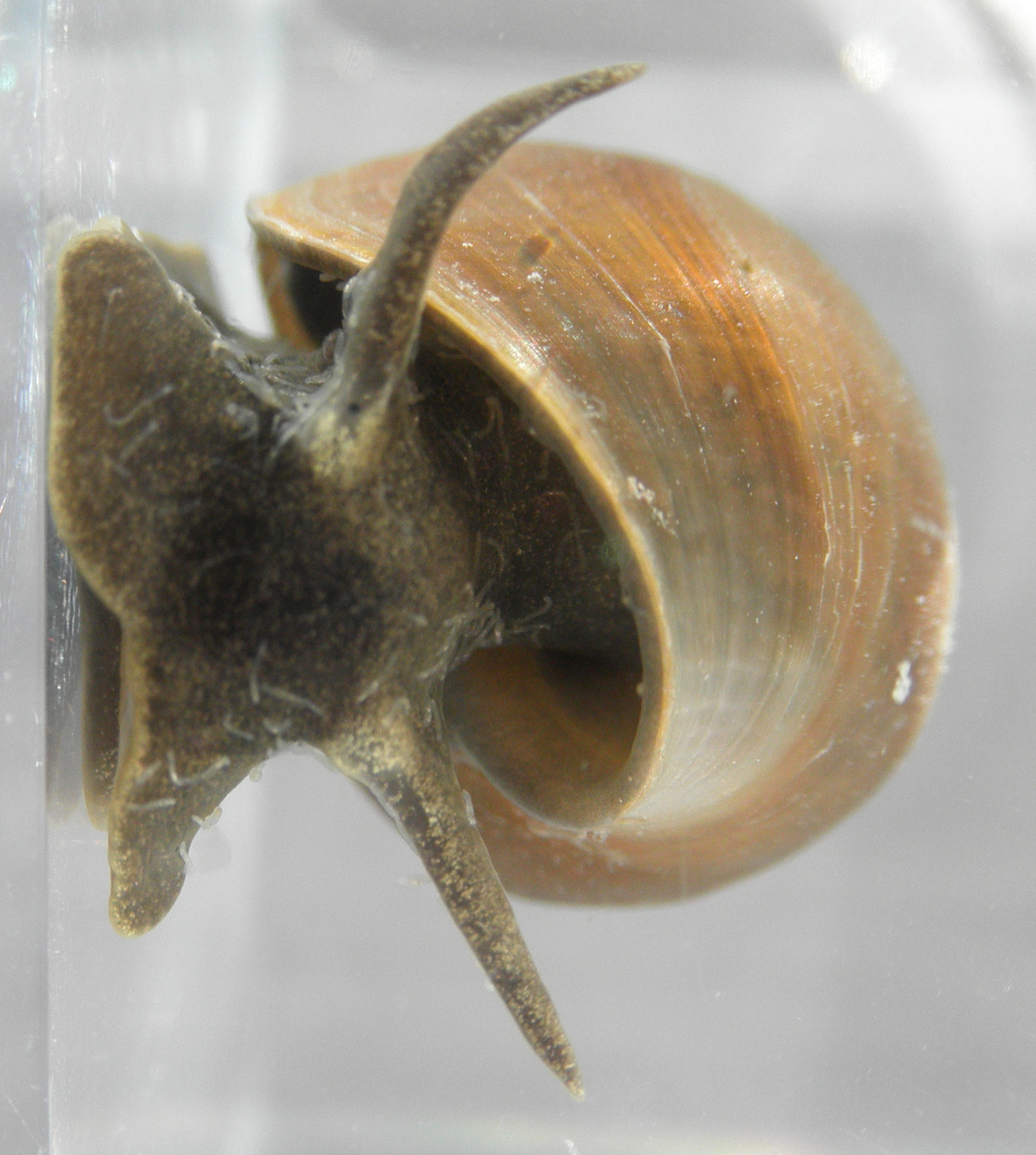
Great pond snail (Lymnaea stagnalis) with a number of Chaetogaster limnaei limnaei.

The species Ch. limnaei represents a peculiar case. It occurs in two subspecies that are clearly distinct in their way of life. One subspecies lives parasitic inside snails (Ch. l. vaughini) and only attacks snails above a certain minimum size. It apparently feeds mainly on the host's kidney cells. The other subspecies (Ch. l. limnaei) attaches itself externally to the body of snails or to the inside of their shell (Lymnaea, Physa, Ancylus, Australorbis and many other genera) and can freely move (so-called commensal ectosymbiosis). It consumes various tiny organisms that it manages to suck in from its vantage point on its host. Apart from, e.g., rotifers and algae, cercariae and miracidia (two types of trematode larvae) are also among its food items. The ecological relationships in this biological control of parasites have been studied by various groups. It seems to play a particularly important role, but can apparently not be used in any practical way. The subspecies Ch. l. limnaei is also often found on freshwater mussels, especially of the genus Sphaerium.

== Reproduction ==
Like almost all members of the Naidinae, Chaeogaster species normally reproduce asexually. They thereby form characteristic chains of two or three worms that come into being through a form of budding. These chains give rise to new individuals through division (paratomy), which have, because of the asexual nature of the multiplication, the same genetic blueprint as the original worm. However, the worms switch to sexual reproduction during difficult times like the winter. The subspecies Ch. l. limnaei then leaves its host in late summer or autumn, lives and sexually reproduces freely in the water for some time and then in spring, attaches itself to new snail hosts.

== Systematics ==
The membership of the genus Chaetogaster to the family Tubificidae and the subfamily Naidinae has meanwhile been confirmed not only on morphological but also on molecular-genetic grounds. According to cytochrome oxidase I sequence studies, its closest relationship is with the genus Amphichaeta of the same subfamily.

Nowadays, nine valid species are placed in the genus Chaetogaster Von Baer 1827:

- Chaetogaster cristallinus Vejdovsky 1883, often written as Chaetogaster crystallinus Vejdovsky; worm chains up to 7 mm in length; common.
- Chaetogaster diaphanus (Gruithuisen 1828); usually from 10–15 mm in length, with extremes down to 2.5 mm (single worms) and up to 25 mm (worm chains); common.
- Chaetogaster diversisetosus Sporka 1983; uncommon (gelegentlich).
- Chaetogaster krasnopolskiae Lastockin 1937; uncommon (gelegentlich).
- Chaetogaster langi Bretscher 1896; widely distributed.
- Chaetogaster limnaei Baer 1827; widely distributed.
  - Ch. l. limnaei Baer, 1827; epizootic on snails.
  - Ch. l. vaghini Gruffydd 1965; parasitic in snails.
- Chaetogaster parvus Pointner 1914; widely distributed.
- Chaetogaster setosus Svetlov 1925; widely distributed.
