= Inanidrilus bonomii =

Scientific classification
- Domain: Eukaryota
- Kingdom: Animalia
- Phylum: Annelida
- Clade: Pleistoannelida
- Clade: Sedentaria
- Class: Clitellata
- Order: Tubificida
- Family: Naididae
- Genus: Inanidrilus
- Species: I. bonomii

Binomial name
- Inanidrilus bonomii Erséus, 1984

Species of annelid

Inanidrilus bonomii is a species of annelid worm. It is known from subtidal coarse coral sands in Italy, in the Mediterranean.
