= Inanidrilus mexicanus =

Scientific classification
- Kingdom: Animalia
- Phylum: Annelida
- Clade: Pleistoannelida
- Clade: Sedentaria
- Class: Clitellata
- Order: Tubificida
- Family: Naididae
- Genus: Inanidrilus
- Species: I. mexicanus

Binomial name
- Inanidrilus mexicanus Erséus & Baker, 1982

Species of annelid

Inanidrilus mexicanus is a species of annelid worm. It is known from the Gulf of Mexico on the west coast of Florida.
