= Inanidrilus belizensis =

Scientific classification
- Domain: Eukaryota
- Kingdom: Animalia
- Phylum: Annelida
- Clade: Pleistoannelida
- Clade: Sedentaria
- Class: Clitellata
- Order: Tubificida
- Family: Naididae
- Genus: Inanidrilus
- Species: I. belizensis

Binomial name
- Inanidrilus belizensis Erséus, 1984

Species of annelid

Inanidrilus belizensis is a species of annelid worm. It is known from subtidal coral sands in Belize, in the Caribbean Sea.
