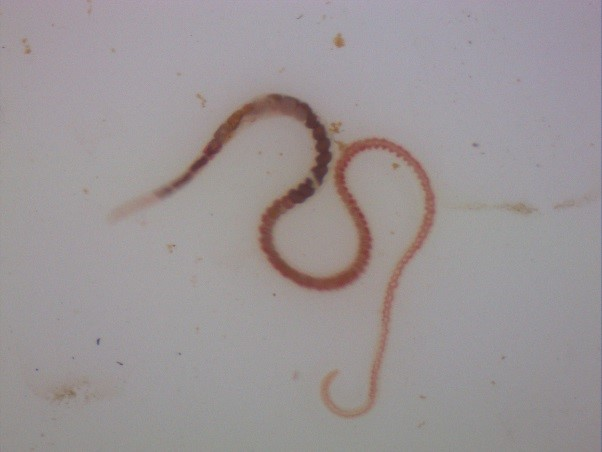

Scientific classification
- Kingdom: Animalia
- Phylum: Annelida
- Clade: Pleistoannelida
- Clade: Sedentaria
- Class: Clitellata
- Order: Tubificida
- Family: Naididae
- Genus: Limnodrilus
- Species: L. hoffmeisteri

Binomial name
- Limnodrilus hoffmeisteri Claparède, 1862

= Limnodrilus hoffmeisteri =

Species of annelid worm

Limnodrilus hoffmeisteri, also known as Red worm, is one of the most widespread and abundant oligochaetes in the world.

== Characteristics ==
Limnodrilus hoffmeisteri is a segmented oligochaete worm with tapering end and typical body length of 25–40 mm. It has a simple conical shaped head without eyespots and a long cylindrical body with 55-95 segments. Each of segments can regenerate into a new individual when separated from the worm body. On each side of the segment, there is an upper and lower bundle of setae to move and burrow sediment. Due to the respiratory pigment haemoglobin, its body usually appears red. Same as all other oligochaetes, this species is a hermaphrodite with a complex reproductive system.

== Living habits ==
Limnodrilus hoffmeisteri lives in fine, sandy and coarse sediments of watercourses, pond and lakes, hyporheic zone and groundwater, feeding on microorganisms and organic material. Due to the lack of gill, it breathes through skin. The front of body is often buried in the sediment whereas the tail of its body is left in the water phase keeping swing to enhance the formation of water flow to promote skin gas exchange.

== Ecological functions ==
Limnodrilus hoffmeisteri is conveyor-belt feeder that ingests particles in deep sediments and egests them on the sediment surface in the form of pseudofeces. The activities of this worm can alter sediment stratification, increase the water content and porosity of sediment, change the distribution of sediment particle size, alter the oxygen and nutrient dynamics in the sediment and across the sediment-water interface, and influence the process of sediment resuspension.

== Environmental implications ==
Limnodrilus hoffmeisteri is well recognized indicator of organic pollution and low dissolved oxygen. It is increasingly being used to test the toxicity of sediment-associated contaminants and their bioaccumulation. Recent study demonstrated that Limnodrilus hoffmeisteri can bioaccumulate hydrophobic contaminants and even degrade them depending on the structure and properties of contaminants.
