= Smithsonidrilus pauper =

Scientific classification
- Kingdom: Animalia
- Phylum: Annelida
- Clade: Pleistoannelida
- Clade: Sedentaria
- Class: Clitellata
- Order: Tubificida
- Family: Naididae
- Genus: Smithsonidrilus
- Species: S. pauper

Binomial name
- Smithsonidrilus pauper Erséus, 1990

Species of annelid

Smithsonidrilus pauper is a species of oligochaete worm. It was first found in Peru.
