= Inanidrilus aduncosetis =

Scientific classification
- Domain: Eukaryota
- Kingdom: Animalia
- Phylum: Annelida
- Clade: Pleistoannelida
- Clade: Sedentaria
- Class: Clitellata
- Order: Tubificida
- Family: Naididae
- Genus: Inanidrilus
- Species: I. aduncosetis

Binomial name
- Inanidrilus aduncosetis Erséus, 1984

Species of annelid

Inanidrilus aduncosetis is a species of annelid worm. It is known from subtidal coarse coral sands in Bermuda, in the Atlantic Ocean.
