= Inanidrilus =

Scientific classification
- Kingdom: Animalia
- Phylum: Annelida
- Clade: Pleistoannelida
- Clade: Sedentaria
- Class: Clitellata
- Order: Tubificida
- Family: Naididae
- Subfamily: Phallodrilinae
- Genus: Inanidrilus; Erséus, 1979

Type species
- Inanidrilus bulbosus Erséus, 1979

Genus of annelids

Inanidrilus is a genus of marine annelid worms, first described by Christer Erséus in 1979. They are gutless and live in the interstitial of tropical and subtropical seas.

== Species ==
Species in this genus include:

- Inanidrilus aduncosetis Erséus, 1984
- Inanidrilus asagittatus Erséus, 1997
- Inanidrilus belizensis Erséus, 1984
- Inanidrilus bonomii Erséus, 1984
- Inanidrilus bulbosus Erséus, 1979
- Inanidrilus carterensis Erséus, 1984
- Inanidrilus dutchae Erséus & Davis, 1989
- Inanidrilus elaboratus Erséus, 1990
- Inanidrilus ernesti Erséus, 1984
- Inanidrilus extremus (Erséus, 1979)
- Inanidrilus exumae Erséus, 2003
- Inanidrilus falcifer Erséus & Baker, 1982
- Inanidrilus fijiensis Erséus, 1984
- Inanidrilus gustavsoni Erséus, 1984
- Inanidrilus leukodermatus (Giere, 1979)
- Inanidrilus makropetalos Erséus, 2003
- Inanidrilus manae Erséus, 1984
- Inanidrilus mexicanus Erséus & Baker, 1982
- Inanidrilus mojicae Erséus, 2003
- Inanidrilus reginae Erséus, 1990
- Inanidrilus renaudae Erséus, 1984
- Inanidrilus scalprum Erséus, 1984
- Inanidrilus speroi Erséus, 1984
- Inanidrilus triangulatus Erséus, 1984
- Inanidrilus vacivus Erséus, 1984
- Inanidrilus wasseri Erséus, 1984
