= Coralliodrilus rugosus =

Scientific classification
- Kingdom: Animalia
- Phylum: Annelida
- Clade: Pleistoannelida
- Clade: Sedentaria
- Class: Clitellata
- Order: Tubificida
- Family: Naididae
- Genus: Coralliodrilus
- Species: C. rugosus

Binomial name
- Coralliodrilus rugosus Erséus, 1990

Species of annelid

Coralliodrilus rugosus is a species of clitellate oligochaete worm, first found in Belize, on the Caribbean side of Central America. It is found in a range of sediments near the limits of saline groundwater, but never below tidal zones.
