= Coralliodrilus randyi =

Scientific classification
- Kingdom: Animalia
- Phylum: Annelida
- Clade: Pleistoannelida
- Clade: Sedentaria
- Class: Clitellata
- Order: Tubificida
- Family: Naididae
- Genus: Coralliodrilus
- Species: C. randyi

Binomial name
- Coralliodrilus randyi Erséus, 1990

Species of annelid

Coralliodrilus randyi is a species of clitellate oligochaete worm, first found in Belize, on the Caribbean side of Central America.
