= Inanidrilus carterensis =

Scientific classification
- Domain: Eukaryota
- Kingdom: Animalia
- Phylum: Annelida
- Clade: Pleistoannelida
- Clade: Sedentaria
- Class: Clitellata
- Order: Tubificida
- Family: Naididae
- Genus: Inanidrilus
- Species: I. carterensis

Binomial name
- Inanidrilus carterensis Erséus, 1984

Species of annelid

Inanidrilus carterensis is a species of annelid worm. It is known from subtidal coral sands from the Carter Reef, near the Lizard Island in the northern part of the Great Barrier Reef. It is a very small species: the holotype measures 2.7 mm (0.11 in).
