= Inanidrilus triangulatus =

Scientific classification
- Domain: Eukaryota
- Kingdom: Animalia
- Phylum: Annelida
- Clade: Pleistoannelida
- Clade: Sedentaria
- Class: Clitellata
- Order: Tubificida
- Family: Naididae
- Genus: Inanidrilus
- Species: I. triangulatus

Binomial name
- Inanidrilus triangulatus Erséus, 1984

Species of annelid

Inanidrilus triangulatus is a species of annelid worm. It is known from subtidal fine coral sands in the Atlantic coast of Florida between Miami and Key Largo.
