= Inanidrilus reginae =

Scientific classification
- Domain: Eukaryota
- Kingdom: Animalia
- Phylum: Annelida
- Clade: Pleistoannelida
- Clade: Sedentaria
- Class: Clitellata
- Order: Tubificida
- Family: Naididae
- Genus: Inanidrilus
- Species: I. reginae

Binomial name
- Inanidrilus reginae Erséus, 1990

Species of annelid

Inanidrilus reginae is a species of clitellate oligochaete worm in the family Naididae. It was first found in Belize, on the Caribbean side of Central America. It lives in subtidal sand with seagrass.
