= Limnodrilus sulphurensis =

Scientific classification
- Kingdom: Animalia
- Phylum: Annelida
- Clade: Pleistoannelida
- Clade: Sedentaria
- Class: Clitellata
- Order: Tubificida
- Family: Naididae
- Genus: Limnodrilus
- Species: L. sulphurensis

Binomial name
- Limnodrilus sulphurensis Fend, Liu & Erséus, 2016

Species of annelid worm

Limnodrilus sulphurensis is a species of extremophile cave-dwelling worm. Discovered in 2007, this species lives in only two known locations in Sulpher Cave Spring at Steamboat Springs' Howelsen Hill in Colorado, United States.

The worms are about an inch long and are approximately 1 to 1.5mm in diameter.
