= Inanidrilus ernesti =

Scientific classification
- Domain: Eukaryota
- Kingdom: Animalia
- Phylum: Annelida
- Clade: Pleistoannelida
- Clade: Sedentaria
- Class: Clitellata
- Order: Tubificida
- Family: Naididae
- Genus: Inanidrilus
- Species: I. ernesti

Binomial name
- Inanidrilus ernesti Erséus, 1984

Species of annelid

Inanidrilus ernesti is a species of annelid worm. It is known from subtidal coarse sands in the Atlantic coast of Florida. It is a small species measuring 3.9–6.7 mm (0.15–0.26 in) in length.
