= Coralliodrilus =

Scientific classification
- Domain: Eukaryota
- Kingdom: Animalia
- Phylum: Annelida
- Clade: Pleistoannelida
- Clade: Sedentaria
- Class: Clitellata
- Order: Tubificida
- Family: Naididae
- Subfamily: Phallodrilinae
- Genus: Coralliodrilus; Erséus, 1979

Species
- See text

Genus of annelid

Coralliodrilus is a genus of clitellate oligochaete worms.

== Species ==
The World Register of Marine Species recognizes the following species in the genus Coralliodrilus:

- Coralliodrilus abjornseni (Michaelsen, 1907)
- Coralliodrilus aequalis Erséus & Davis, 1989
- Coralliodrilus amissus Arslan, Timm & Erséus, 2007
- Coralliodrilus angustiductus Erséus, 1993
- Coralliodrilus artabrensis Martinez-Ansemil & Caramelo, 2009
- Coralliodrilus atriobifidus Erséus, 1981
- Coralliodrilus bidentatus Erséus, 1993
- Coralliodrilus corpulentus Erséus, 1986
- Coralliodrilus giacobbei Erséus, 1982
- Coralliodrilus hamatilis Erséus, 1984
- Coralliodrilus hanleyi Erséus, 1997
- Coralliodrilus improvisus Erséus, 1997
- Coralliodrilus kirkmani Erséus, 1990
- Coralliodrilus leviatriatus Erséus, 1979
- Coralliodrilus longiductus Erséus, 1983
- Coralliodrilus mirus Erséus, 1990
- Coralliodrilus mollis Erséus, 1993
- Coralliodrilus oviatriatus Erséus, 1981
- Coralliodrilus parvigenitalis Erséus, 1981
- Coralliodrilus priscus Erséus & Milligan, 1992
- Coralliodrilus randyi Erséus, 1990
- Coralliodrilus regius Erséus, 1990
- Coralliodrilus rugosus Erséus, 1990
- Coralliodrilus statutus Erséus, 1982
- Coralliodrilus tyndariensis Erséus, 1982
- Coralliodrilus unicus Erséus, 1993
