= Pristina (disambiguation) =

Pristina is the capital and largest city of Kosovo.

Pristina may also refer to:

- District of Pristina, Kosovo
- FC Prishtina, a football club of Pristina
- Pristina Municipality, Kosovo
- Pristina International Airport Adem Jashari, an international airport in Kosovo
- Pristina (annelid), a genus of annelids in the family Naididae

== See also ==
- University of Pristina (disambiguation)
- Hasan Prishtina (1873–1933), Albanian politician and activist
