= Aulophorus =

Scientific classification
- Kingdom: Animalia
- Phylum: Annelida
- Clade: Pleistoannelida
- Clade: Sedentaria
- Class: Clitellata
- Order: Tubificida
- Family: Naididae
- Subfamily: Naidinae
- Genus: Aulophorus; L. K. Schmarda, 1861

Genus of annelid worms

Aulophorus is a genus of Naididae.

The genus was described in 1861 by L. K. Schmarda.

Species:

- Aulophorus africanus (Michaelsen, 1914)
- Aulophorus barbatus (Righi & Hamoui, 2002)
- Aulophorus beadlei (Stephenson, 1931)
- Aulophorus bimagnasetus (Harman, 1974)
- Aulophorus borellii (Michaelsen, 1900)
- Aulophorus caraibicus (Michaelsen, 1933)
- Aulophorus carteri (Stephenson, 1931)
- Aulophorus costatus (Du Bois-Reymond Marcus, 1944)
- Aulophorus flabelliger (Stephenson, 1931)
- Aulophorus furcatus (Müller, 1774)
- Aulophorus ghanensis (Hrabĕ, 1966)
- Aulophorus gravelyi (Stephenson, 1925)
- Aulophorus heptabrachionus (Liang, 1958)
- Aulophorus huaronensis (Piguet, 1928)
- Aulophorus hymanae (Naidu, 1962)
- Aulophorus indicus (Naidu, 1962)
- Aulophorus kalina (Righi, 2002)
- Aulophorus lodeni (Brinkhurst, 1986)
- Aulophorus moghei (Naidu & Srivastava, 1980)
- Aulophorus opistocystoides (Nesemann, Shah & Tachamo, 2007)
- Aulophorus pectinatus (Stephenson, 1931)
- Aulophorus schmardai (Michaelsen, 1905)
- Aulophorus superterrenus (Michaelsen, 1912)
- Aulophorus tonkinensis (Vejdovský, 1894)
- Aulophorus tridentatus (Hrabĕ, 1966)
- Aulophorus vagus (Leidy, 1880)
- Aulophorus varians (Liang, 1958)
