= Homochaeta =

Scientific classification
- Domain: Eukaryota
- Kingdom: Animalia
- Phylum: Annelida
- Clade: Pleistoannelida
- Clade: Sedentaria
- Class: Clitellata
- Order: Tubificida
- Family: Naididae
- Genus: Homochaeta; Bretscher, 1896

Genus of annelid worms

Homochaeta is a genus of annelids belonging to the family Naididae.

Species:

- Homochaeta naidina Bretscher, 1896
