= Vejdovskyella =

Scientific classification
- Kingdom: Animalia
- Phylum: Annelida
- Clade: Pleistoannelida
- Clade: Sedentaria
- Class: Clitellata
- Order: Tubificida
- Family: Naididae
- Subfamily: Naidinae
- Genus: Vejdovskyella; Michaelsen, 1903

Synonyms
- Bohemilla Vejdovský, 1884; Macrochaeta Bretscher, 1896

Genus of annelid worms

Vejdovskyella is a genus of annelids, belonging to the family Naididae.

The genus was described in 1903 by W. Michaelsen.

Species:

- Vejdovskyella baicalensis Semernoy, 1994
- Vejdovskyella comata (Vejdovský, 1883)
- Vejdovskyella dilucida Snimschikova, 1987
- Vejdovskyella galinae Semernoy, 1994
- Vejdovskyella intermedia (Bretscher, 1896)
- Vejdovskyella koshovi (Sokolskaya, 1962)
- Vejdovskyella macrochaeta (Lastočkin, 1921)
- Vejdovskyella margaritae Semernoy, 1994
- Vejdovskyella schizodentata Semernoy, 1982
- Vejdovskyella simplex Liang, 1958
- Vejdovskyella sublitoralis Semernoy, 1994
