= Aulodrilus =

Scientific classification
- Domain: Eukaryota
- Kingdom: Animalia
- Phylum: Annelida
- Clade: Pleistoannelida
- Clade: Sedentaria
- Class: Clitellata
- Order: Tubificida
- Family: Naididae
- Genus: Aulodrilus; Bretscher, 1899

Genus of annelid worms

Aulodrilus is a genus of annelids belonging to the family Naididae.

Species:

- Aulodrilus americanus Brinkhurst & Cook, 1966
- Aulodrilus limnobius Bretscher, 1899
