= Lophochaeta =

Scientific classification
- Domain: Eukaryota
- Kingdom: Animalia
- Phylum: Annelida
- Clade: Pleistoannelida
- Clade: Sedentaria
- Class: Clitellata
- Order: Tubificida
- Family: Naididae
- Genus: Lophochaeta; Štolc, 1886

Genus of annelids

Lophochaeta is a genus of annelids belonging to the family Naididae.

The species of this genus are found in Eurasia and Northern America.

Species:

- Lophochaeta ignota Štolc, 1886
- Lophochaeta paucipilifer Holmquist, 1985
