= Piguetiella =

Scientific classification
- Domain: Eukaryota
- Kingdom: Animalia
- Phylum: Annelida
- Clade: Pleistoannelida
- Clade: Sedentaria
- Class: Clitellata
- Order: Tubificida
- Family: Naididae
- Subfamily: Naidinae
- Genus: Piguetiella; Sperber, 1940

Genus of annelid worms

Piguetiella is a genus of annelids (segmented worms) belonging to the family Naididae.

Species:

- Piguetiella blanci (Piguet, 1906)
- Piguetiella michiganensis Hiltunen, 1967
