= Nais (annelid) =

Scientific classification
- Kingdom: Animalia
- Phylum: Annelida
- Clade: Pleistoannelida
- Clade: Sedentaria
- Class: Clitellata
- Order: Tubificida
- Family: Naididae
- Subfamily: Naidinae
- Genus: Nais; Müller, 1774

Genus of annelid worms

Nais is a genus of Naididae.

The genus was described in 1774 by Otto Friedrich Müller.

It has cosmopolitan distribution.

Species:

- Nais communis
- Nais elinguis
- Nais variabilis
