= Paranais =

Scientific classification
- Domain: Eukaryota
- Kingdom: Animalia
- Phylum: Annelida
- Clade: Pleistoannelida
- Clade: Sedentaria
- Class: Clitellata
- Order: Tubificida
- Family: Naididae
- Subfamily: Naidinae
- Genus: Paranais; Czerniavsky, 1881

Genus of annelid worms

Paranais is a genus of annelids belonging to the family Naididae.

The genus has cosmopolitan distribution.

Species:

- Paranais birtsteini Sokolskaya, 1971
- Paranais botniensis Sperber, 1948
