= Uncinais =

Scientific classification
- Domain: Eukaryota
- Kingdom: Animalia
- Phylum: Annelida
- Clade: Pleistoannelida
- Clade: Sedentaria
- Class: Clitellata
- Order: Tubificida
- Family: Naididae
- Subfamily: Naidinae
- Genus: Uncinais; Levinsen, 1884

Genus of annelid worms

Uncinais is a genus of annelids belonging to the family Naididae.

The species of this genus are found in Eurasia and Northern America.

Species:

- Uncinais golyschkinae Akinschina, 1984
- Uncinais minor Sokolskaja, 1962
- Uncinais uncinata (Ørsted, 1842)
