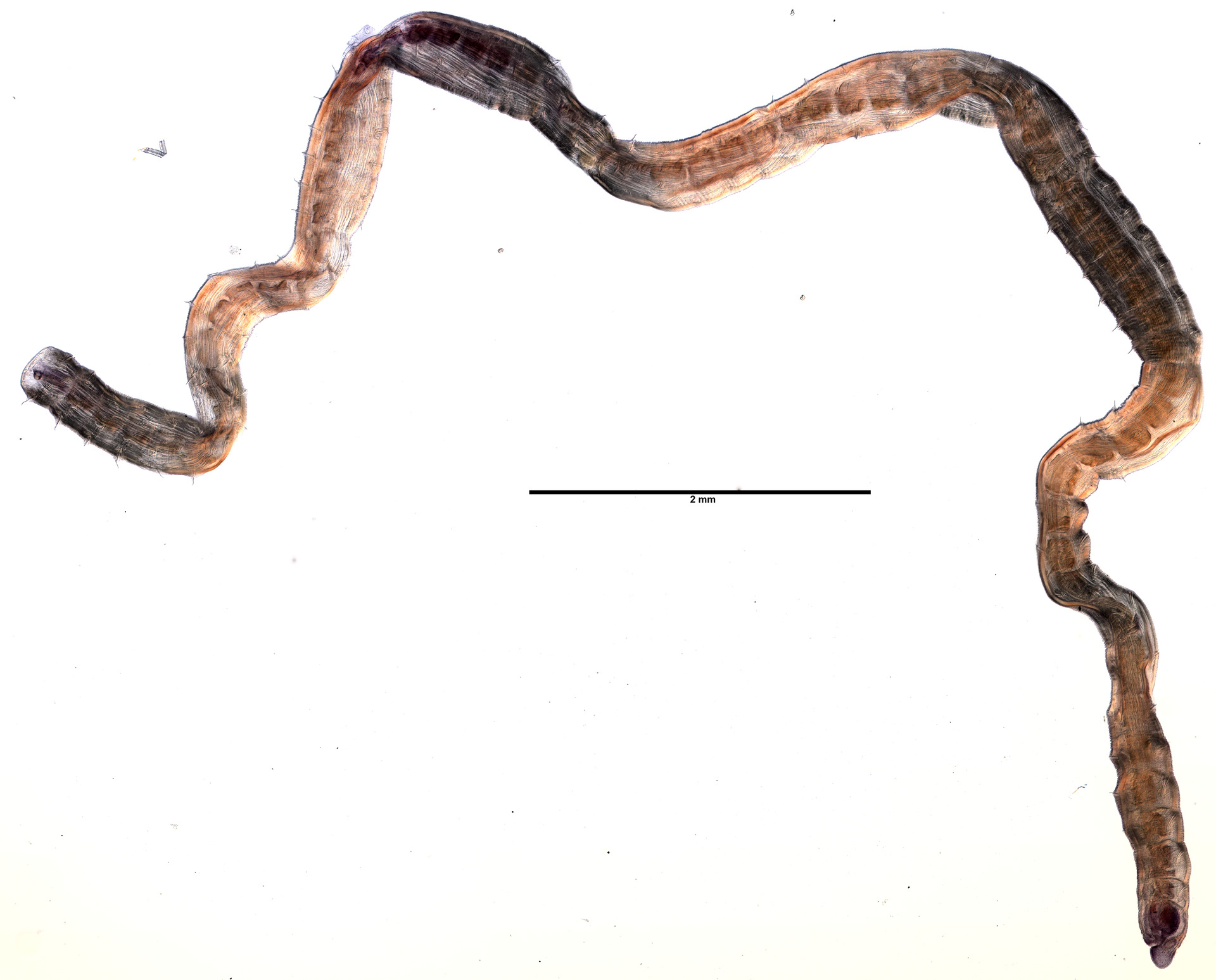
- Tubificoides longipenis

Scientific classification
- Kingdom: Animalia
- Phylum: Annelida
- Clade: Pleistoannelida
- Clade: Sedentaria
- Class: Clitellata
- Order: Tubificida
- Family: Naididae
- Subfamily: Tubificinae
- Genus: Tubificoides; Lastočkin, 1937

= Tubificoides =

Genus of annelid worms

Tubificoides is a genus of annelids belonging to the family Naididae.

The genus was described in 1937 by Lastočkin.

Species:

- Tubificoides aculeatus (Cook, 1969)
- Tubificoides aguadillensis Milligan, 1987
- Tubificoides amplivasatus (Erséus, 1975)
- Tubificoides annulus Erséus, 1986
- Tubificoides apectinatus Brinkhurst, 1965
- Tubificoides bakeri Brinkhurst, 1985
- Tubificoides benedii (Udekem, 1855)
- Tubificoides heterochaetus
- Tubificoides pseudogaster
