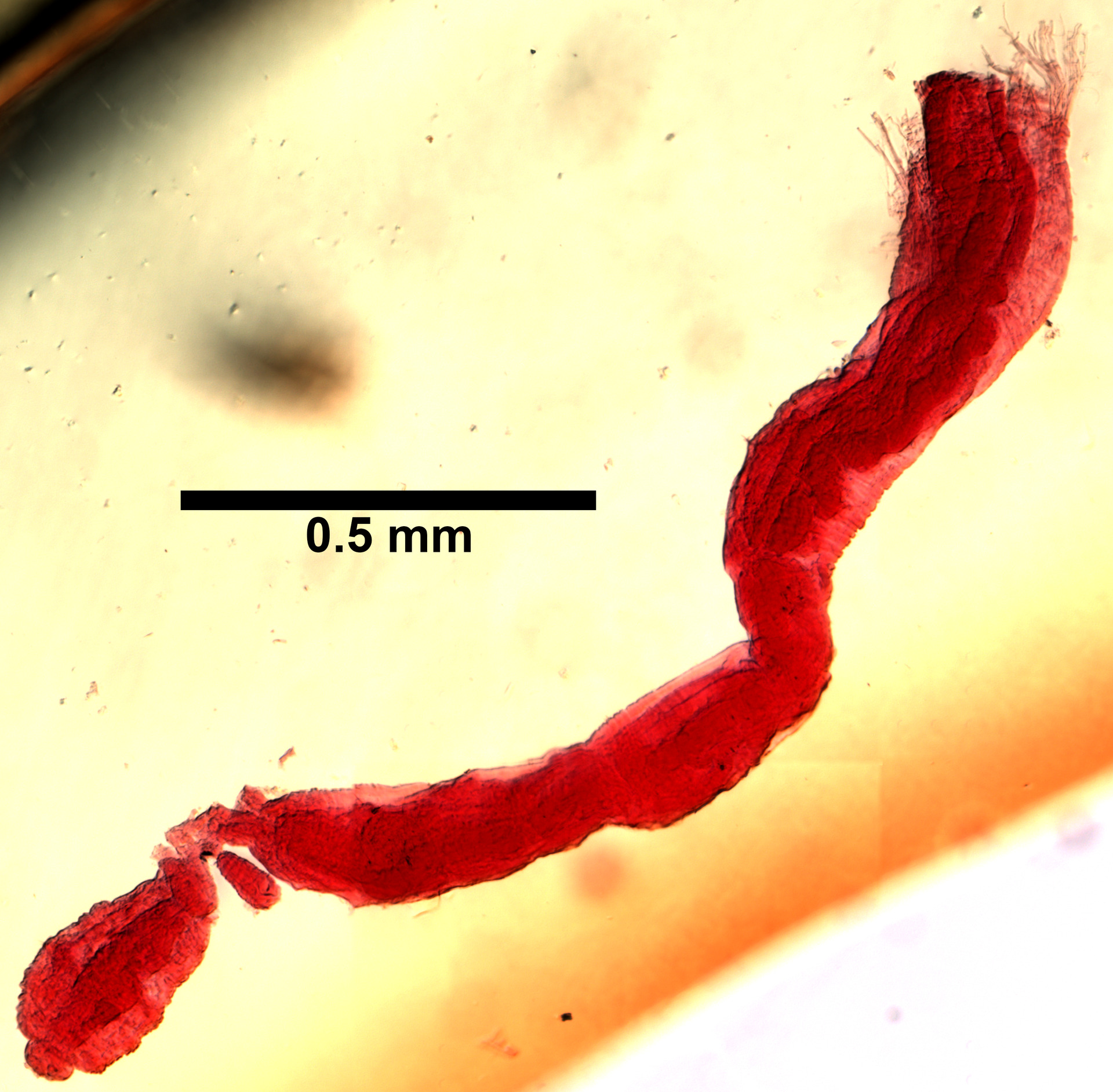
- Limnodriloides medioporus

Scientific classification
- Kingdom: Animalia
- Phylum: Annelida
- Clade: Pleistoannelida
- Clade: Sedentaria
- Class: Clitellata
- Order: Tubificida
- Family: Naididae
- Subfamily: Limnodriloidinae
- Genus: Limnodriloides; Pierantoni, 1903

Type species
- Limnodriloides appendiculatus Pierantoni, 1903

Species
- See text

= Limnodriloides =

Genus of annelid

Limnodriloides is a genus of clitellate oligochaete worms.

== Species ==
Species accepted within Limnodriloides include:

- Limnodriloides adversus Erséus, 1990
- Limnodriloides agnes Hrabĕ, 1967
- Limnodriloides anxius Erséus, 1990
- Limnodriloides appendiculatus Pierantoni, 1903
- Limnodriloides armatus Erséus, 1982
- Limnodriloides ascensionae Erséus, 1982
- Limnodriloides atriotumidus Erséus, 1982
- Limnodriloides australis Erséus, 1982
- Limnodriloides baculatus Erséus, 1982
- Limnodriloides barnardi Cook, 1974
- Limnodriloides basilicus Finogenova, 1986
- Limnodriloides biforis Erséus, 1990
- Limnodriloides bipapillatus Erséus, 1984
- Limnodriloides brycei Erséus, 1990
- Limnodriloides bulbopenitus Wang & Liang, 1997
- Limnodriloides clavellatus Finogenova, 1986
- Limnodriloides claviger Erséus, 1982
- Limnodriloides cribensis Erséus, 1990
- Limnodriloides ezoensis Takashima & Mawatari, 1996
- Limnodriloides faxatus Erséus & Milligan, 1988
- Limnodriloides flumineus Erséus, 1990
- Limnodriloides fraternus Erséus, 1990
- Limnodriloides fuscus Erséus, 1984
- Limnodriloides gossensis Erséus, 1997
- Limnodriloides hastatus Erséus, 1982
- Limnodriloides hawaiiensis Erséus & Davis, 1989
- Limnodriloides hrabetovae Erséus, 1987
- Limnodriloides insolitus Erséus, 1989
- Limnodriloides janstocki Erséus, 1992
- Limnodriloides lateroporus Erséus, 1997
- Limnodriloides macinnesi Erséus, 1990
- Limnodriloides major Erséus, 1990
- Limnodriloides maslinicensis (Hrabĕ, 1971)
- Limnodriloides medioporus Cook, 1969
- Limnodriloides monothecus Cook, 1974
- Limnodriloides olearius Erséus & Milligan, 1989
- Limnodriloides parahastatus Erséus, 1984
- Limnodriloides pierantonii (Hrabĕ, 1971)
- Limnodriloides problematicus Erséus, 1990
- Limnodriloides rubicundus Erséus, 1982
- Limnodriloides sacculus Erséus, 1990
- Limnodriloides scandinavicus Erséus, 1982
- Limnodriloides solitarius Erséus & Wang, 2005
- Limnodriloides sphaerothecus Erséus, 1982
- Limnodriloides stercoreus Erséus, 1990
- Limnodriloides tarutensis Erséus, 1986
- Limnodriloides tenuiductus Erséus, 1982
- Limnodriloides thrushi Erséus, 1989
- Limnodriloides toloensis Erséus, 1984
- Limnodriloides triplus Erséus, 1990
- Limnodriloides uniampullatus Erséus, 1982
- Limnodriloides validus Erséus, 1982
- Limnodriloides vermithecatus Erséus, 1997
- Limnodriloides vespertinus Erséus, 1982
- Limnodriloides victoriensis Brinkhurst & Baker, 1979
- Limnodriloides virginiae Erséus, 1982
- Limnodriloides winckelmanni Michaelsen, 1914
