= Ilyodrilus =

Scientific classification
- Kingdom: Animalia
- Phylum: Annelida
- Clade: Pleistoannelida
- Clade: Sedentaria
- Class: Clitellata
- Order: Tubificida
- Family: Naididae
- Subfamily: Tubificinae
- Genus: Ilyodrilus; Eisen, 1879

Genus of annelids

Ilyodrilus is a genus of annelids belonging to the family Naididae.

Species:

- Ilyodrilus asiaticus
- Ilyodrilus coccineus
- Ilyodrilus frantzi
