= Varichaetadrilus =

Scientific classification
- Kingdom: Animalia
- Phylum: Annelida
- Clade: Pleistoannelida
- Clade: Sedentaria
- Class: Clitellata
- Order: Tubificida
- Family: Naididae
- Subfamily: Tubificinae
- Genus: Varichaetadrilus; Brinkhurst & Kathman, 1983

Genus of annelid worms

Varichaetadrilus is a genus of annelids belonging to the family Naididae.

The species of this genus are found in Eurasia and Northern America.

Species:

- Varichaetadrilus bizkaiensis Rodriguez & Giani, 1984
- Varichaetadrilus fulleri Brinkhurst & Kathman, 1983
