= Inanidrilus leukodermatus =

Scientific classification
- Kingdom: Animalia
- Phylum: Annelida
- Clade: Pleistoannelida
- Clade: Sedentaria
- Class: Clitellata
- Order: Tubificida
- Family: Naididae
- Genus: Inanidrilus
- Species: I. leukodermatus

Binomial name
- Inanidrilus leukodermatus (Giere, 1979)

Synonyms
- Phallodrilus leukodermatus Giere, 1979

Species of annelid

Inanidrilus leukodermatus is a species of annelid worm. It is known from poorly oxygenated intertidal and subtidal carbonate sands in Belize (Caribbean Sea) and Bermuda (Atlantic Ocean). Living specimens typically measure 20 mm (0.79 in) in length and can measure as much as 25 mm (0.98 in), but preserved specimens are only up to 11.4 mm (0.45 in).
