= Branchiura (annelid) =

Scientific classification
- Kingdom: Animalia
- Phylum: Annelida
- Clade: Pleistoannelida
- Clade: Sedentaria
- Class: Clitellata
- Order: Tubificida
- Family: Naididae
- Genus: Branchiura; Beddard, 1892

Genus of annelid worms

Branchiura is a genus of annelids belonging to the family Naididae.

The genus has cosmopolitan distribution.

Species:

- Branchiura sowerbyi Beddard, 1892
