= Inanidrilus manae =

Scientific classification
- Domain: Eukaryota
- Kingdom: Animalia
- Phylum: Annelida
- Clade: Pleistoannelida
- Clade: Sedentaria
- Class: Clitellata
- Order: Tubificida
- Family: Naididae
- Genus: Inanidrilus
- Species: I. manae

Binomial name
- Inanidrilus manae Erséus, 1984

Species of annelid

Inanidrilus manae is a species of annelid worm. It is known from subtidal coral sands in Fiji, in the Pacific Ocean. It is a small species with preserved specimens measuring 4.7–5.2 mm (0.19–0.20 in) in length.
