= Isochaetides =

Scientific classification
- Domain: Eukaryota
- Kingdom: Animalia
- Phylum: Annelida
- Clade: Pleistoannelida
- Clade: Sedentaria
- Class: Clitellata
- Order: Tubificida
- Family: Naididae
- Subfamily: Tubificinae
- Genus: Isochaetides; Hrabĕ, 1966

Genus of annelid worms

Isochaetides is a genus of annelids belonging to the family Naididae (=Tubificidae).

The species of this genus are found in Eurasia and America.

Species:

- Isochaetides adenodicystis Semernoy, 1982
- Isochaetides arenarius (Michaelsen, 1926)
- Isochaetides baicalensis (Michaelsen, 1901)
- Isochaetides compactus Semernoy, 2004
- Isochaetides curvisetosus (Brinkhurst et Cook, 1966)
- Isochaetides distinctus Semernoy, 2004
- Isochaetides duopenialis Semernoy, 2004
- Isochaetides durus Semernoy, 2004
- Isochaetides freyi (Brinkhurst, 1965)
- Isochaetides gianii Rodriguez et Achurra, 2010
- Isochaetides grubei (Michaelsen, 1905)
- Isochaetides hamatus (Moore, 1905)
- Isochaetides lacustris (Černosvitov, 1939)
- Isochaetides martini Kaygorodova, 2006
- Isochaetides michaelseni (Lastočkin, 1937)
- Isochaetides palmatus He, Cui et Wang, 2012
- Isochaetides peniacerus Semernoy, 2004
- Isochaetides resorptus Snimschikova et Akinschina, 1994
- Isochaetides septatus Semernoy, 2004
- Isochaetides suspectus Sokolskaya, 1964
- Isochaetides werestschagini Akinshina et Snimschikova, 1991
