= Arcteonais =

Scientific classification
- Domain: Eukaryota
- Kingdom: Animalia
- Phylum: Annelida
- Clade: Pleistoannelida
- Clade: Sedentaria
- Class: Clitellata
- Order: Tubificida
- Family: Naididae
- Subfamily: Naidinae
- Genus: Arcteonais; Piguet, 1928

Genus of annelid worms

Arcteonais is a genus of annelids belonging to the family Naididae.

The species of this genus are found in Eurasia and Northern America.

Species:

- Arcteonais inconstans
- Arcteonais lomondi (Martin, 1907)
