= Tasserkidrilus =

Scientific classification
- Kingdom: Animalia
- Phylum: Annelida
- Clade: Pleistoannelida
- Clade: Sedentaria
- Class: Clitellata
- Order: Tubificida
- Family: Naididae
- Subfamily: Tubificinae
- Genus: Tasserkidrilus; Holmquist, 1985

Genus of annelid worms

Tasserkidrilus is a genus of annelids belonging to the family Naididae.

The species of this genus are found in Eurasia and Northern America.

Species:

- Tasserkidrilus acapillatus Finogenova, 1972
- Tasserkidrilus americanus (Brinkhurst & Cook, 1966)
