= Spirosperma =

Scientific classification
- Kingdom: Animalia
- Phylum: Annelida
- Clade: Pleistoannelida
- Clade: Sedentaria
- Class: Clitellata
- Order: Tubificida
- Family: Naididae
- Genus: Spirosperma; Eisen, 1879

Genus of annelid worms

Spirosperma is a genus of annelids belonging to the family Naididae.

The species of this genus are found in Eurasia and Northern America.

Species:

- Spirosperma apapillatus (Lastočkin, 1953)
- Spirosperma beetoni Brinkhurst, 1965
