= Potamothrix =

Scientific classification
- Kingdom: Animalia
- Phylum: Annelida
- Clade: Pleistoannelida
- Clade: Sedentaria
- Class: Clitellata
- Order: Tubificida
- Family: Naididae
- Subfamily: Tubificinae
- Genus: Potamothrix; Vejdovský & Mrázek, 1903

Genus of annelid worms

Potamothrix is a genus of annelids belonging to the family Naididae.

Species:

- Potamothrix alatus Finogenova, 1972
- Potamothrix bavaricus (Oschmann, 1913)
- Potamothrix bedoti (Piguet, 1913)
