= Ainudrilus =

Scientific classification
- Domain: Eukaryota
- Kingdom: Animalia
- Phylum: Annelida
- Clade: Pleistoannelida
- Clade: Sedentaria
- Class: Clitellata
- Order: Tubificida
- Family: Naididae
- Subfamily: Rhyacodrilinae
- Genus: Ainudrilus; Finogenova, 1982

Species
- See text

Genus of annelid

Ainudrilus is a genus of clitellate oligochaete worms.

== Species ==
The World Register of Marine Species recognizes the following species in the genus Ainudrilus:

- Ainudrilus angustivasa Pinder & Halse, 2002
- Ainudrilus billabongus (Brinkhurst, 1984)
- Ainudrilus brendae Erséus, 1997
- Ainudrilus dartnalli Erséus & Grimm, 2002
- Ainudrilus fultoni (Brinkhurst, 1982)
- Ainudrilus geminus Erséus, 1990
- Ainudrilus gibsoni Erséus, 1990
- Ainudrilus lutulentus (Erséus, 1984)
- Ainudrilus mediocris Erséus, 1997
- Ainudrilus ngopitchup Pinder & Halse, 2002
- Ainudrilus nharna Pinder & Brinkhurst, 2000
- Ainudrilus oceanicus Finogenova, 1982
- Ainudrilus pauciseta Wang & Erséus, 2003
- Ainudrilus piliferus Erséus, 1997
- Ainudrilus stagnalis Erséus, 1997
- Ainudrilus taitamensis Erséus, 1990
- Ainudrilus vallus Erséus & Wang, 2003
