= Heronidrilus =

Scientific classification
- Domain: Eukaryota
- Kingdom: Animalia
- Phylum: Annelida
- Clade: Pleistoannelida
- Clade: Sedentaria
- Class: Clitellata
- Order: Tubificida
- Family: Naididae
- Genus: Heronidrilus; Erséus & Jamieson, 1981

Genus of worms

Heronidrilus is a genus of annelids belonging to the family Naididae, first described by Christer Erséus and Barrie Jamieson in 1981.

The species of this genus are found in Australia, Europe.

Species:

- Heronidrilus bihamis Erséus & Jamieson, 1981
- Heronidrilus clayi Erséus, 1993
- Heronidrilus fastigatus Erséus & Jamieson, 1981
- Heronidrilus gravidus Erséus, 1990
- Heronidrilus heronae (Erséus & Jamieson, 1981)
- Heronidrilus hutchingsae Erséus, 1990
