= Bratislavia =

Scientific classification
- Domain: Eukaryota
- Kingdom: Animalia
- Phylum: Annelida
- Clade: Pleistoannelida
- Clade: Sedentaria
- Class: Clitellata
- Order: Tubificida
- Family: Naididae
- Subfamily: Naidinae
- Genus: Bratislavia; Kosel, 1976

Genus of annelid worms

Bratislavia is a genus of annelids belonging to the family Naididae.

The species of this genus are found in Eurasia and America.

Species:

- Bratislavia bilongata (Chen, 1944)
- Bratislavia dadayi (Michaelsen, 1905)
