= Peipsidrilus =

Scientific classification
- Domain: Eukaryota
- Kingdom: Animalia
- Phylum: Annelida
- Clade: Pleistoannelida
- Clade: Sedentaria
- Class: Clitellata
- Order: Tubificida
- Family: Naididae
- Subfamily: Tubificinae
- Genus: Peipsidrilus; Timm, 1977

Genus of annelids

Peipsidrilus is a genus of annelids belonging to the family Naididae.

Species:

- Peipsidrilus pusillus
- Peipsidrilus saamicus
