= Psammoryctides barbatus =

Scientific classification
- Kingdom: Animalia
- Phylum: Annelida
- Clade: Pleistoannelida
- Clade: Sedentaria
- Class: Clitellata
- Order: Tubificida
- Family: Naididae
- Genus: Psammoryctides
- Species: P. barbatus

Binomial name
- Psammoryctides barbatus Grube, 1860

Species of annelids

Psammoryctides barbatus is a species of annelids belonging to the family Naididae. The species was first recorded in 1860 by Adolf Eduard Grube.

This species is most commonly found in Europe, especially Northern Europe, but it has been recorded in places such as Northern Africa, Siberia and the Chesapeake Bay. The species was discovered for the first time in Iraq in 2016 during samples of the Gharraf and Dijaila rivers.
