= Smithsonidrilus =

Scientific classification
- Kingdom: Animalia
- Phylum: Annelida
- Clade: Pleistoannelida
- Clade: Sedentaria
- Class: Clitellata
- Order: Tubificida
- Family: Naididae
- Subfamily: Limnodriloidinae
- Genus: Smithsonidrilus; Brinkhurst, 1966

Species
- See text

Genus of annelid

Smithsonidrilus is a genus of oligochaete worms.

== Species ==
The following species are currently recognized within Smithsonidrilus:

- Smithsonidrilus appositus Erséus, 1990
- Smithsonidrilus arcuatus Erséus, 1997
- Smithsonidrilus arduus Erséus, 1997
- Smithsonidrilus assimilis (Erséus, 1990)
- Smithsonidrilus capricornae (Erséus, 1983)
- Smithsonidrilus convexus Erséus, 1997
- Smithsonidrilus edgari Erséus, 1993
- Smithsonidrilus exspectatus Erséus, 1993
- Smithsonidrilus fecundus Erséus & Wang, 2005
- Smithsonidrilus grandiculus (Erséus, 1983)
- Smithsonidrilus hummelincki (Righi & Kanner, 1979)
- Smithsonidrilus involutus Erséus, 1990
- Smithsonidrilus irregularis (Erséus, 1983)
- Smithsonidrilus ludmillae Erséus, 1997
- Smithsonidrilus luteolus (Erséus, 1983)
- Smithsonidrilus marinus Brinkhurst, 1966
- Smithsonidrilus minusculus (Erséus, 1983)
- Smithsonidrilus multiglandularis Erséus, 1990
- Smithsonidrilus nimius Erséus, 1997
- Smithsonidrilus pauper Erséus, 1990
- Smithsonidrilus peruanus (Finogenova, 1986)
- Smithsonidrilus sacculatus (Erséus, 1983)
- Smithsonidrilus tenuiculus (Erséus, 1984)
- Smithsonidrilus tuber (Erséus, 1983)
- Smithsonidrilus vesiculatus (Erséus, 1984)
- Smithsonidrilus westoni Erséus, 1982
