= Ophidonais =

Scientific classification
- Domain: Eukaryota
- Kingdom: Animalia
- Phylum: Annelida
- Clade: Pleistoannelida
- Clade: Sedentaria
- Class: Clitellata
- Order: Tubificida
- Family: Naididae
- Subfamily: Naidinae
- Genus: Ophidonais; Gervais, 1838

Genus of roundworms

Ophidonais is a genus of annelids belonging to the family Naididae.

The species of this genus are found in Eurasia and America.

Species:

- Ophidonais serpentina (Müller, 1773)
- Ophidonais vermicularis Gervais, 1838
