= Haemonais =

Scientific classification
- Domain: Eukaryota
- Kingdom: Animalia
- Phylum: Annelida
- Clade: Pleistoannelida
- Clade: Sedentaria
- Class: Clitellata
- Order: Tubificida
- Family: Naididae
- Subfamily: Naidinae
- Genus: Haemonais; Bretscher, 1900

Genus of annelids

Haemonais is a genus of annelids belonging to the family Naididae.

Species:

- Haemonais waldvogeli Bretscher, 1900
- Haemonais laurentii Stephenson, 1915, accepted as Haemonais waldvogeli Bretscher, 1900
