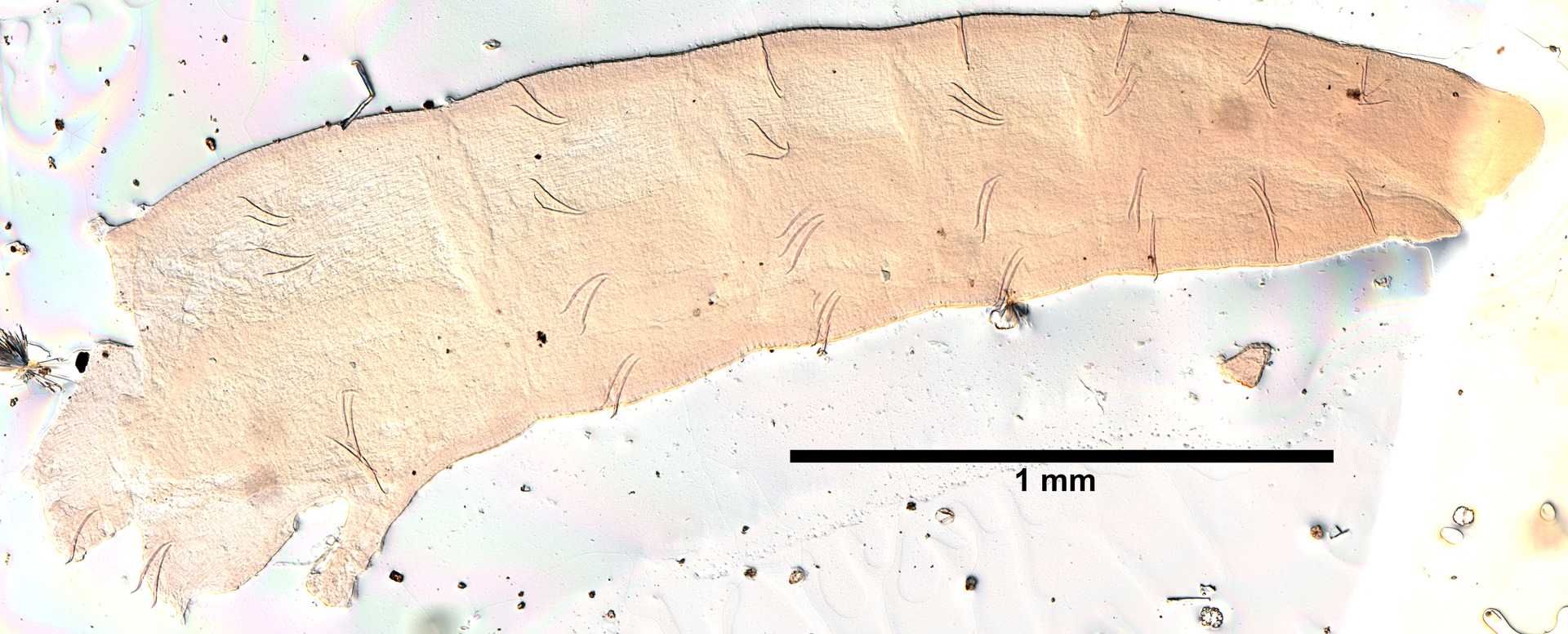
- Clitellio arenarius

Scientific classification
- Kingdom: Animalia
- Phylum: Annelida
- Clade: Pleistoannelida
- Clade: Sedentaria
- Class: Clitellata
- Order: Tubificida
- Family: Naididae
- Subfamily: Tubificinae
- Genus: Clitellio; Savigny, 1820

Synonyms
- Peloryctes Leuckart, 1849

= Clitellio =

Genus of annelid worms

Clitellio is a genus of annelids belonging to the family Naididae.

The species of this genus are found in Europe, the Russian Far East and North America.

== Species ==
The following species are recognised in the genus Clitellio:

- Clitellio alpestris (Eisen, 1879)
- Clitellio arenarius (Müller, 1776)
- Clitellio cavernicolus Botea, 1983
- Clitellio cubanicus Botea, 1983
- Clitellio dubius Czerniavsky, 1881
- Clitellio heterosetosus Czerniavsky, 1881
- Clitellio orientalis Finogenova, 1991
- Clitellio (Clitelloides) poseidonicus (Finogenova, 1985)
- Clitellio (Clitelloides) saxosus Finogenova, 1985
- Clitellio suchumicus Czerniavsky, 1881
- Clitelloides orientalis Finogenova, 1991
- BOLD:AAG8543 (Clitellio sp.)
