= Limnodriloidinae =

Scientific classification
- Domain: Eukaryota
- Kingdom: Animalia
- Phylum: Annelida
- Clade: Pleistoannelida
- Clade: Sedentaria
- Class: Clitellata
- Order: Tubificida
- Family: Naididae
- Subfamily: Limnodriloidinae; Ehrenberg, 1828

Genera
- See text

Subfamily of annelid

Limnodriloidinae is a subfamily of clitellate oligochaete worms.

== Species ==
The following genera are currently recognized within Limnodriloidinae:

- Doliodrilus Erséus, 1984
- Limnodriloides Pierantoni, 1903
- Parakaketio Erséus, 1982
- Rossidrilus Erséus & Rota, 1996
- Smithsonidrilus Brinkhurst, 1966
- Tectidrilus Erséus, 1982
- Thalassodrilides Brinkhurst & Baker, 1979
