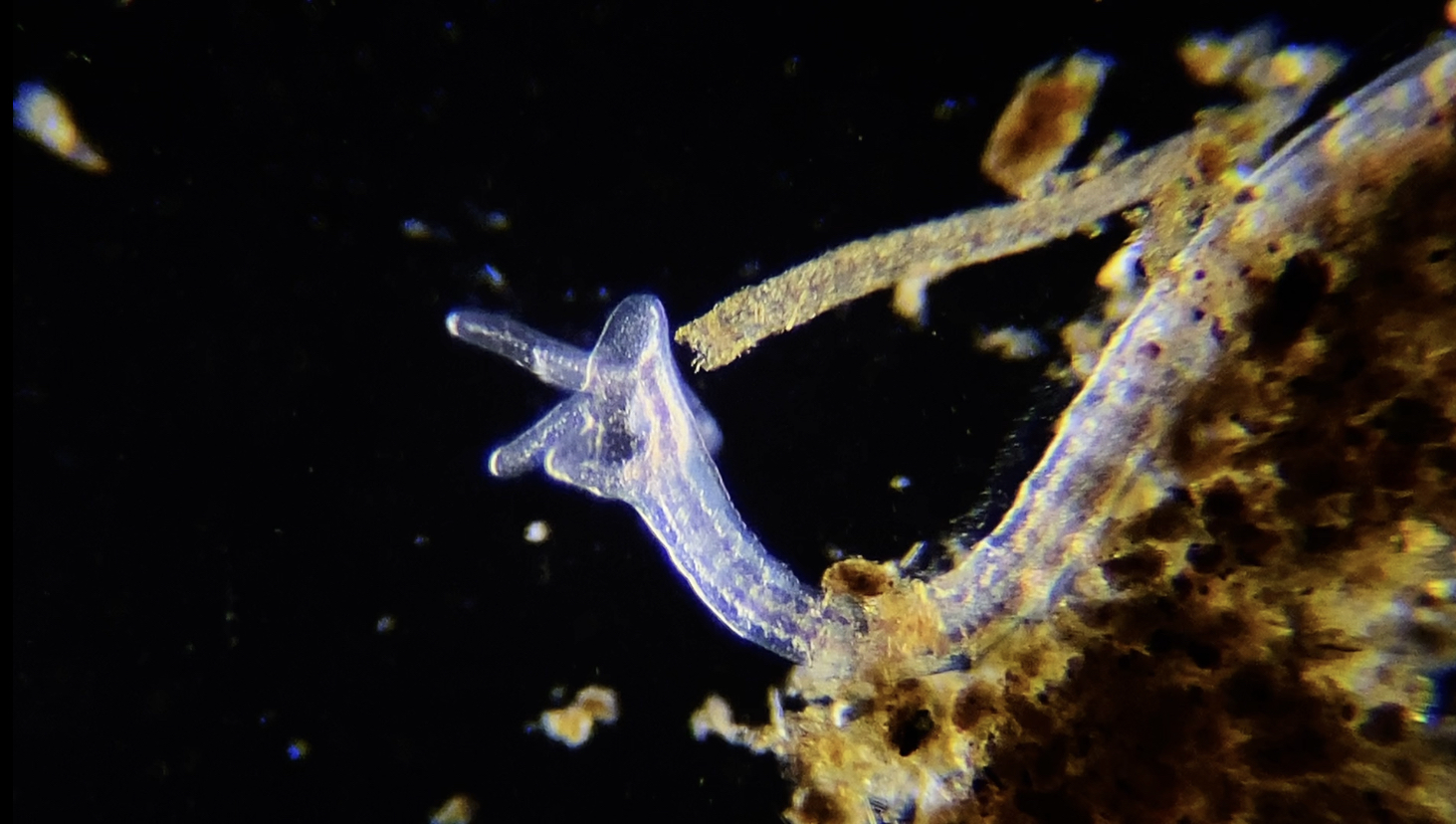
- Dero digitata

Scientific classification
- Kingdom: Animalia
- Phylum: Annelida
- Clade: Pleistoannelida
- Clade: Sedentaria
- Class: Clitellata
- Order: Tubificida
- Family: Naididae
- Subfamily: Naidinae
- Genus: Dero; Oken, 1815

Synonyms
- Proto Ørsted, 1842; Dera Bory, 1827; Xantho Dutrochet, 1819; Dero (Dero) Oken, 1815

= Dero (annelid) =

Genus of annelid worms

Dero is a genus of annelids belonging to the family Naididae. The genus has cosmopolitan distribution.

The following species are assigned to this genus:

- Dero (Dero) haitiensis Dumnicka, 1986
- Dero abranchiata Harman, 1977
- Dero asiatica Černosvitov, 1930
- Dero botrytis Marcus, 1943
- Dero cooperi Stephenson, 1932
- Dero delayi Botea, 1983
- Dero digitata (Müller, 1774)
- Dero discocephalus
- Dero dorsalis Ferronnière, 1899
- Dero evelinae Marcus, 1943
- Dero haitiensis Dumnicka, 1986
- Dero indica Naidu, 1962
- Dero magna Harman, 1974
- Dero multibranchiata Stieren, 1892
- Dero nivea Aiyer, 1929
- Dero oblongata Grimm, 1985
- Dero obtusa d'Udekem, 1855
- Dero palmata Aiyer, 1929
- Dero pectinata Aiyer, 1929
- Dero phewatalensis Nesemann & S. Sharma, 2007
- Dero plumosa Naidu, 1962
- Dero raviensis (Stephenson, 1914)
- Dero righii Varela, 1990
- Dero rwandae Sinsch, Dehling, Scheid & Balczun, 2019
- Dero sawayai Marcus, 1943
- Dero scalariformis Righi & Hamoui, 2002
- Dero trifida Loden, 1979
- Dero tuna Righi & Hamoui, 2002
- Dero zeylanica Stephenson, 1913
