= Ripistes =

Scientific classification
- Domain: Eukaryota
- Kingdom: Animalia
- Phylum: Annelida
- Clade: Pleistoannelida
- Clade: Sedentaria
- Class: Clitellata
- Order: Tubificida
- Family: Naididae
- Subfamily: Naidinae
- Genus: Ripistes; Dujardin, 1842

Species
- Ripistes parasita (Schmidt, 1847)

Genus of roundworms

Ripistes is a monotypic genus of annelids belonging to the family Naididae. Its sole species, Ripistes parasita, is found in Eurasia and Northern America.

This aquatic oligochaete species has been detected in the Great Lakes at varying depths, specifically within the range of 6 meters to 10 meters. These observations encompass its presence on both barren, rocky substrates and amid macrophyte vegetation. In riverine environments, specimens of this oligochaete have been documented in water depths spanning from 0.9 meters to 3.5 meters. Furthermore, they have been observed in diverse flow rates, ranging from calm conditions to speeds of up to 50 cm/s (Simpson and Abele 1984; Montz 1988).
