= Baikalodrilus =

Scientific classification
- Domain: Eukaryota
- Kingdom: Animalia
- Phylum: Annelida
- Clade: Pleistoannelida
- Clade: Sedentaria
- Class: Clitellata
- Order: Tubificida
- Family: Naididae
- Subfamily: Tubificinae
- Genus: Baikalodrilus; Holmquist, 1978

Genus of annelid worms

Baikalodrilus is a genus of annelids belonging to the family Naididae.

The species of this genus are found in Russia.

Species:

- Baikalodrilus alienus Timm, 1998
- Baikalodrilus bekmanae (Snimschikova, 1984)
