= Stylaria =

Stylaria may refer to:

- Stylaria (annelid), a genus of worms in the family Naididae
- Stylaria (alga), a genus of algae in the class Bacillariophyceae
