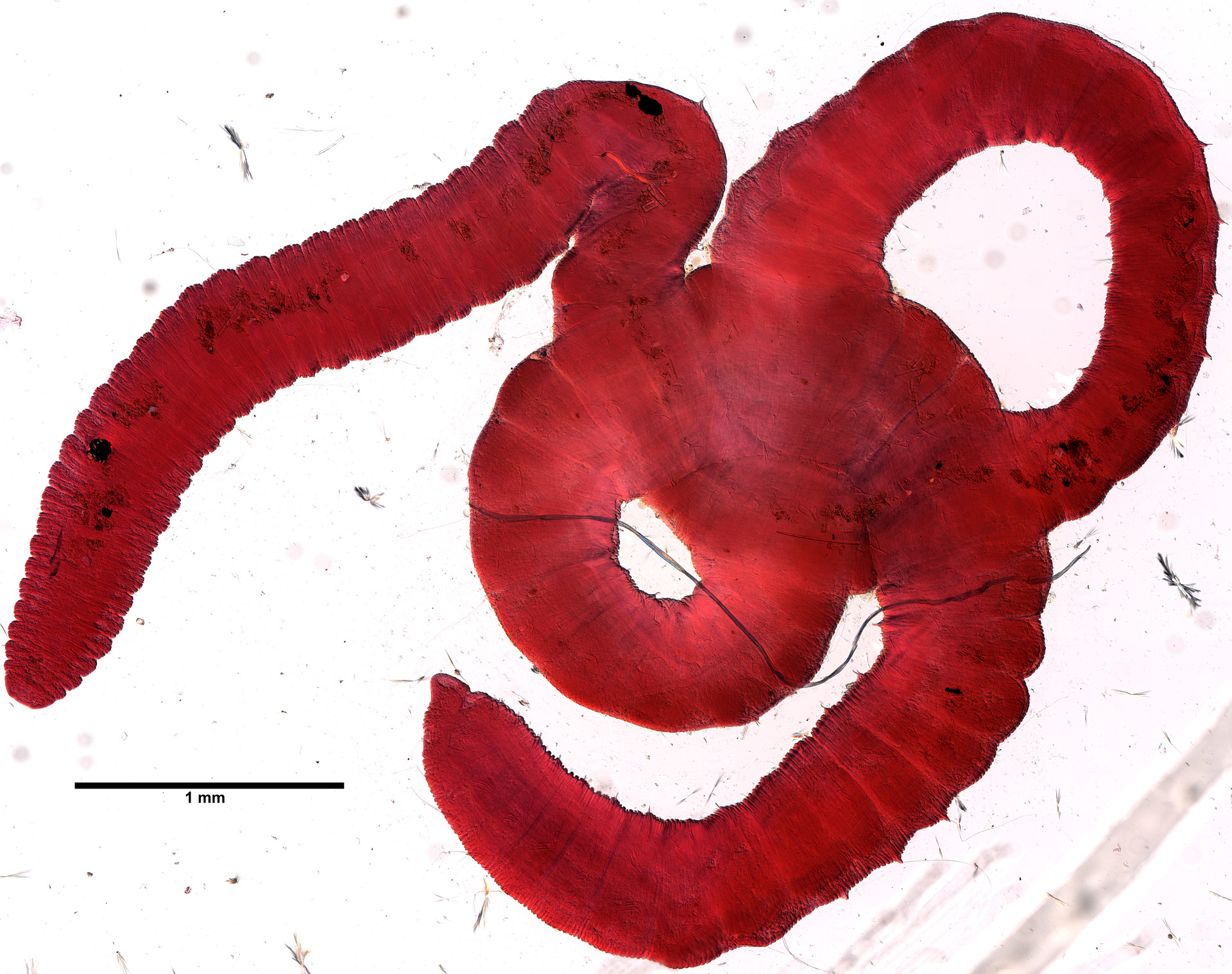

Scientific classification
- Domain: Eukaryota
- Kingdom: Animalia
- Phylum: Annelida
- Clade: Pleistoannelida
- Clade: Sedentaria
- Class: Clitellata
- Order: Tubificida
- Family: Naididae
- Genus: Monopylephorus; Levinsen, 1884

= Monopylephorus =

Genus of annelid worms

Monopylephorus is a genus of annelids belonging to the family Naididae.

The genus has cosmopolitan distribution.

Species:

- Monopylephorus aucklandicus (Benham, 1909)
- Monopylephorus camachoi Rodriguez, 1999
- Monopylephorus cuticulatus Baker & Brinkhurst, 1981
- Monopylephorus evertus Baker & Brinkhurst, 1981
- Monopylephorus irroratus (Verrill, 1873)
- Monopylephorus kermadecensis (Benham, 1915)
- Monopylephorus limosus (Hatai, 1898)
- Monopylephorus moleti Brinkhurst & Machese, 1987
- Monopylephorus parvus Ditlevsen, 1904
- Monopylephorus rubroniveus Levinsen, 1884
