= Hamburger gill disease =

Infectious disease of catfish

Hamburger gill disease, also known as proliferative gill disease, is an infectious disease of catfish caused primarily by the myxozoan parasite Henneguya ictaluri. The disease is characterized by severe damage to the gills, which become swollen, hemorrhagic, and mottled and may resemble raw hamburger meat, giving the disease its common name.

== Etiologic agent ==
Hamburger gill disease most commonly results from infection with Henneguya ictaluri, a myxozoan parasite with a two host life cycle involving the channel catfish (Ictalurus punctatus) and the aquatic worm, Dero digitata. Infected worms release the actinospore stage of H. ictaluri into the water, where it can infect catfish through the gills, skin or gastrointestinal tract.

Following infection, H. ictaluri disseminates throughout the fish before development becomes concentrated in the gills.

== Disease ==
The characteristic lesions of hamburger gill disease result from extensive damage to the gills. As the disease progresses, swelling and proliferation of gill tissue reduce the surface area available for gas exchange, impairing respiratory functions. Damage to the cartilage can weaken the gill filaments, causing them to weaken and collapse.

== Treatment and prevention ==
There are currently no effective treatments for hamburger gill disease.

Smallmouth buffalo, which feed on D. digitata, have been investigated as a biological control method for controlling hamburger gill disease. A three year study found no reduction in disease severity.

== Ecology ==
Hamburger gill disease was thought to only affect farmed fish; however, parasites resembling Henneguya species have been observed in the gills of infected wild fish.
