= Tubificinae =

Scientific classification
- Kingdom: Animalia
- Phylum: Annelida
- Clade: Pleistoannelida
- Clade: Sedentaria
- Class: Clitellata
- Order: Tubificida
- Family: Naididae
- Subfamily: Tubificinae; Claus, 1876

Subfamily of annelid worms

Tubificinae is a subfamily of annelids belonging to the family Naididae.

The following genera are assigned to Tubificinae:

- Baikalodrilus Holmquist, 1978
- Baltidrilus Timm, 2013
- Christerius Holmquist, 1985
- Clitellio Savigny, 1822
- Ilyodrilus Eisen, 1879
- Isochaetides Hrabĕ, 1966
- Limnodrilus Claparède, 1862
- Potamothrix Vejdovský & Mrázek, 1903
- Psammoryctides Erséus & Healy, 2001
- Tasserkidrilus Holmquist, 1985
- Telliclio Timm, 1978
- Tubifex Lamarck, 1816
- Tubificoides Lastočkin, 1937
- Varichaetadrilus Brinkhurst & Kathman, 1983
