= Pristina (annelid) =

Scientific classification
- Domain: Eukaryota
- Kingdom: Animalia
- Phylum: Annelida
- Clade: Pleistoannelida
- Clade: Sedentaria
- Class: Clitellata
- Order: Tubificida
- Family: Naididae
- Genus: Pristina; Ehrenberg, 1828

Genus of annelid worms

Pristina is a genus of annelids belonging to the family Naididae.

Species:

- Pristina acuminata Liang, 1958
- Pristina aequiseta Bourne, 1891
- Pristina americana Cernosvitov, 1937
- Pristina bilobata (Bretscher, 1903)
