= Heterodrilus =

Scientific classification
- Kingdom: Animalia
- Phylum: Annelida
- Clade: Pleistoannelida
- Clade: Sedentaria
- Class: Clitellata
- Order: Tubificida
- Family: Naididae
- Genus: Heterodrilus; Pierantoni, 1902

Genus of annelid worms

Heterodrilus is a genus of annelids belonging to the family Naididae.

The genus has cosmopolitan distribution.

Species:

- Heterodrilus amplus Erséus, 1992
- Heterodrilus apparatus Erséus, 1993
- Heterodrilus arenicolus Pierantoni, 1902
- Heterodrilus ascensionensis Erséus, 1981
- Heterodrilus bulbiporus Erséus, 1981
- Heterodrilus carinatus Erséus & Wang, 2003
- Heterodrilus chenianus Wang & Erséus, 2003
- Heterodrilus claviatriatus Erséus, 1981
- Heterodrilus decipiens Erséus, 1997
- Heterodrilus densus Erséus, 1997
- Heterodrilus devexus Erséus, 1997
- Heterodrilus dolosus Erséus, 1997
- Heterodrilus eremita Erséus, 1997
- Heterodrilus ersei (Giere, 1979)
- Heterodrilus flexuosus Erséus, 1990
- Heterodrilus hispidus Erséus, 1986
- Heterodrilus inermis (Erséus, 1981)
- Heterodrilus jamiesoni Erséus, 1981
- Heterodrilus keenani Erséus, 1981
- Heterodrilus lacertosus Erséus, 1981
- Heterodrilus maccaini Erséus, 1984
- Heterodrilus maiusculus Erséus, 1988
- Heterodrilus mediopapillosus Takashima & Mawatari, 1997
- Heterodrilus minisetosus Erséus, 1981
- Heterodrilus modestus Erséus, 1990
- Heterodrilus nudus Wang & Erséus, 2003
- Heterodrilus obliquus Erséus, 1997
- Heterodrilus occidentalis Erséus, 1981
- Heterodrilus paucifascis Milligan, 1987
- Heterodrilus pentcheffi Erséus, 1981
- Heterodrilus perkinsi Erséus, 1986
- Heterodrilus quadrithecatus (Erséus, 1981)
- Heterodrilus queenslandicus (Jamieson, 1977)
- Heterodrilus rapidensis Erséus, 1997
- Heterodrilus rarus Erséus, 1990
- Heterodrilus salmonensis Erséus, 1993
- Heterodrilus scitus Erséus, 1981
- Heterodrilus subtilis (Pierantoni, 1917)
- Heterodrilus tripartitus Sjölin & Erséus, 2001
- Heterodrilus uniformis Wang & Erséus, 2003
- Heterodrilus ursulae Sjölin & Erséus, 2001
- Heterodrilus virilis Erséus, 1992
