= Claparède =

Claparède is a surname. Notable people with the surname include:

- Édouard Claparède (1873–1940), a Swiss neurologist, child psychologist, and educator
- Jean Louis René Antoine Édouard Claparède (1832–1871), a Swiss zoologist
- Michel Claparède (1770–1842), a French general
