= Manae =

Manae may refer to:

- Inanidrilus manae, a species of annelid worm
- Manaé Feleu, French rugby union player
