= Stylaria (annelid) =

Scientific classification
- Kingdom: Animalia
- Phylum: Annelida
- Clade: Pleistoannelida
- Clade: Sedentaria
- Class: Clitellata
- Order: Tubificida
- Family: Naididae
- Subfamily: Naidinae
- Genus: Stylaria; Lamarck, 1816

Genus of annelid worms

Stylaria is a genus of annelids belonging to the family Naididae. These worms are often found in freshwater environments and are characterized by a long, retractile proboscis. The genus has almost cosmopolitan distribution.

Species:

- Stylaria fossularis Leidy, 1852
- Stylaria lacustris Linnaeus, 1758
