= Pararhyacodrilus =

Scientific classification
- Domain: Eukaryota
- Kingdom: Animalia
- Phylum: Annelida
- Clade: Pleistoannelida
- Clade: Sedentaria
- Class: Clitellata
- Order: Tubificida
- Family: Naididae
- Genus: Pararhyacodrilus; Snimschikova, 1986

Genus of annelid worms

Pararhyacodrilus is a genus of annelids belonging to the family Naididae.

The species of this genus are found in Europe and Russia.

Species:

- Pararhyacodrilus aspersus Snimschikova, 1986
- Pararhyacodrilus confusus Semernoy, 2004
- Pararhyacodrilus ekmani (Piguet, 1928)
- Pararhyacodrilus palustris (Ditlevsen, 1904)
