= Thalassodrilides =

Scientific classification
- Kingdom: Animalia
- Phylum: Annelida
- Clade: Pleistoannelida
- Clade: Sedentaria
- Class: Clitellata
- Order: Tubificida
- Family: Naididae
- Genus: Thalassodrilides; Brinkhurst & Baker, 1979

Genus of annelid worms

Thalassodrilides is a genus of annelids belonging to the family Naididae.

The genus has almost cosmopolitan distribution.

Species:

- Thalassodrilides belli (Cook, 1974)
- Thalassodrilides briani Erséus, 1992
- Thalassodrilides bruneti Erséus, 1990
- Thalassodrilides gurwitschi (Hrabĕ, 1971)
- Thalassodrilides ineri (Righi & Kanner, 1979)
- Thalassodrilides milleri Brinkhurst & Baker, 1979
- Thalassodrilides pectinatus (Pierantoni, 1903)
- Thalassodrilides roseus (Pierantoni, 1903)
