= Protuberodrilus =

Scientific classification
- Domain: Eukaryota
- Kingdom: Animalia
- Phylum: Annelida
- Clade: Pleistoannelida
- Clade: Sedentaria
- Class: Clitellata
- Order: Tubificida
- Family: Naididae
- Genus: Protuberodrilus; Giani & Martinez-Ansemil, 1979

Genus of annelid worms

Protuberodrilus is a genus of annelids belonging to the family Naididae.

The species of this genus are found in Spain.

Species:

- Protuberodrilus tourenqui Giani & Martínez-Ansemil, 1979
