= Dero digitata =

Conservation status
- Unranked (NatureServe)

Scientific classification
- Kingdom: Animalia
- Phylum: Annelida
- Clade: Pleistoannelida
- Clade: Sedentaria
- Class: Clitellata
- Order: Tubificida
- Family: Naididae
- Genus: Dero
- Species: D. digitata

Binomial name
- Dero digitata (Müller, 1774)

Synonyms
- List: Dero (Dero) digitata (Müller, 1774); Nais digitata Müller, 1774; Nais digitata Müller, 1773; Uronais digitata (Muller, 1774); Dero quadribranchiata Černosvitov, 1937; Dero kawamurai Kondo, 1936; Dero tanimotoi Kondo, 1936; Dero michaelseni Svetlov, 1924; Dero incisa Michaelsen, 1903; Dero mülleri Bousfield, 1887; Dero acuta Bousfield, 1886; Dero philippinensis Semper, 1877; Dero limosa Leidy, 1852; Proto digitata Ørsted, 1842; Nais florifera Oken, 1815

Species of segmented worm

Dero digitata is a species of annelid with a cosmopolitan distribution. This species is one of the hosts in the two-host cycle of infection of the myxozoan parasite Henneguya ictaluri.
