= Epirodrilus =

Scientific classification
- Domain: Eukaryota
- Kingdom: Animalia
- Phylum: Annelida
- Clade: Pleistoannelida
- Clade: Sedentaria
- Class: Clitellata
- Order: Tubificida
- Family: Naididae
- Genus: Epirodrilus; Hrabe, 1931

Genus of annelid worms

Epirodrilus is a genus of annelids belonging to the family Naididae. It is classified within the Clitellata.

Species:

- Epirodrilus michaelseni Hrabe, 1930
