= Slavina =

Slavina may refer to:

- Slavina, Litija, a settlement in the Municipality of Litija, central Slovenia
- Slavina, Postojna, a village in the Inner Carniola region of Slovenia
- Slavina (annelid), a genus of annelids in the family Naididae

== People with the surname ==
- Irina Slavina (journalist) (1973–2020), Russian journalist
- Irina Turova (chess player) (born 1979), née Slavina, Russian chess player
- Nagita Slavina (born 1988), Indonesian actress, presenter and singer
