= Heterochaeta =

Heterochaeta may refer to:

- Heterochaeta (mantis), a genus of mantises in the family Toxoderidae
- Heterochaeta, a genus of annelids in the family Naididae, synonym of Baltidrilus
- Heterochaeta, a genus of copepods in the family Heterorhabdidae, synonym of Heterorhabdus
- Heterochaeta, a genus of plants in the family Poaceae, synonym of Ventenata
- Heterochaeta, a genus of plants in the family Asteraceae, synonym of Aster
