= Slavina (annelid) =

Scientific classification
- Kingdom: Animalia
- Phylum: Annelida
- Clade: Pleistoannelida
- Clade: Sedentaria
- Class: Clitellata
- Order: Tubificida
- Family: Naididae
- Subfamily: Naidinae
- Genus: Slavina; Vejdovský, 1884

Genus of annelid worms

Slavina is a genus of annelids belonging to the family Naididae.

The genus has cosmopolitan distribution.

Species:

- Slavina appendiculata (Udekem, 1855)
- Slavina evelinae (Marcus, 1942)
- Slavina isochaeta Černosvitov, 1939
- Slavina proceriseta Pinder & Brinkhurst, 1998
- Slavina sawayai Marcus, 1944
