= Tarmo Timm =

Estonian zoologist (born 1936)

Tarmo Timm (born 4 June 1936) is an Estonian zoologist (Annelida).

He has described the following taxa:

- Baltidrilus Timm, 2013
- Peipsidrilus Timm, 1977

== See also ==
- List of zoologists
- Timeline of zoology
- Zoology
