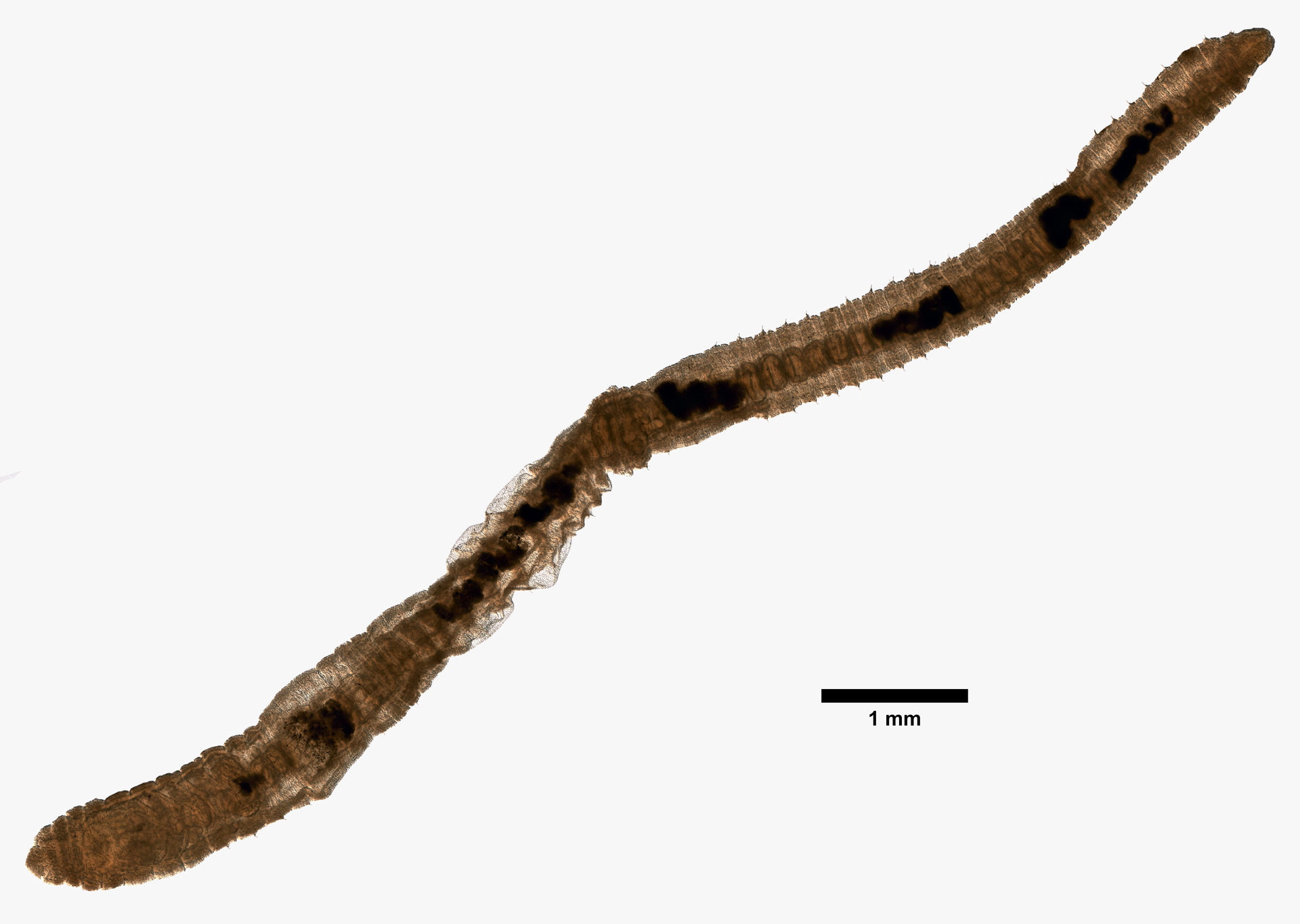
- Amphichaeta

Scientific classification
- Domain: Eukaryota
- Kingdom: Animalia
- Phylum: Annelida
- Clade: Pleistoannelida
- Clade: Sedentaria
- Class: Clitellata
- Order: Tubificida
- Family: Naididae
- Subfamily: Naidinae
- Genus: Amphichaeta; Tauber, 1879

= Amphichaeta =

Genus of annelid worms

Amphichaeta is a genus of annelids belonging to the family Naididae.

The genus was first described by P. Tauber in 1879.

== Species ==
- Amphichaeta leydigi
- Amphichaeta sannio Kallstenius, 1892
