= Naidinae =

- A freshwater annelid.

Scientific classification
- Kingdom: Animalia
- Phylum: Annelida
- Clade: Pleistoannelida
- Clade: Sedentaria
- Class: Clitellata
- Order: Tubificida
- Family: Naididae
- Subfamily: Naidinae; Ehrenberg, 1831

Genera
- See text

Subfamily of annelid worms

Naidinae is a subfamily of annelids belonging to the family Naididae.

According to the World Register of Marine Species, 24 genera are accepted:

- Allodero Sperber, 1948
- Allonais Sperber, 1948
- Amphichaeta Tauber, 1879
- Arcteonais Piguet, 1928
- Aulophorus Schmarda, 1861
- Branchiodrilus Michaelsen, 1900
- Bratislavia Košel, 1976
- Chaetogaster von Baer, 1827
- Dero Oken, 1815
- Haemonais Bretscher, 1900
- Nais Müller, 1774
- Neonais Sokolskaya, 1962
- Ophidonais Gervais, 1838
- Paranais Czerniavsky, 1881
- Pedonais Collado & Schmelz, 2000
- Piguetiella Sperber, 1939
- Rhopalonais Dzwillo & R. Grimm, 1974
- Ripistes Dujardin, 1842
- Slavina Vejdovský, 1884
- Specaria Sperber, 1939
- Stephensoniana Černosvitov, 1938
- Stylaria Lamarck, 1816
- Uncinais Levinsen, 1884
- Vejdovskyella Michaelsen, 1903
