= Peristodrilus =

Scientific classification
- Kingdom: Animalia
- Phylum: Annelida
- Clade: Pleistoannelida
- Clade: Sedentaria
- Class: Clitellata
- Order: Tubificida
- Family: Naididae
- Genus: Peristodrilus; Baker & Brinkhurst, 1981

Genus of annelid worms

Peristodrilus is a genus of annelids belonging to the family Naididae.

The species of this genus are found in Europe.

Species:

- Peristodrilus montanus (Hrabě, 1962)
