= Rhyacodrilus =

Scientific classification
- Domain: Eukaryota
- Kingdom: Animalia
- Phylum: Annelida
- Clade: Pleistoannelida
- Clade: Sedentaria
- Class: Clitellata
- Order: Tubificida
- Family: Naididae
- Genus: Rhyacodrilus; Bretscher, 1901

Genus of annelid worms

Rhyacodrilus is a genus of annelids belonging to the family Naididae.

The genus has cosmopolitan distribution.

Species:

- Rhyacodrilus abyssalis
- Rhyacodrilus alcyoneus Rodriguez & Fend, 2013
