= Baltidrilus =

Scientific classification
- Domain: Eukaryota
- Kingdom: Animalia
- Phylum: Annelida
- Clade: Pleistoannelida
- Clade: Sedentaria
- Class: Clitellata
- Order: Tubificida
- Family: Naididae
- Subfamily: Tubificinae
- Genus: Baltidrilus; Timm, 2013

Genus of annelid worms

Baltidrilus is a genus of annelids belonging to the family Naididae.

The species of this genus are found in Estonia.

Species:

- Baltidrilus costatus (Claparéde, 1863)
