= Psammoryctides =

Scientific classification
- Kingdom: Animalia
- Phylum: Annelida
- Clade: Pleistoannelida
- Clade: Sedentaria
- Class: Clitellata
- Order: Tubificida
- Family: Naididae
- Genus: Psammoryctides; Hrabe, 1964

Genus of annelid worms

Psammoryctides is a genus of annelids belonging to the family Naididae.

The species of this genus are found in Eurasia and North America.

Species:

- Psammoryctides albicola Michaelsen, 1901
- Psammoryctides batillifer Schmankewicz, 1873
- Psammoryctides barbatus Grube, 1860
- Psammoryctides californianus Brinkhurst, 1965
- Psammoryctides convolutus Loden, 1978
- Psammoryctides deserticola Grimm, 1876
- Psammoryctides hadzii Karaman, 1974
- Psammoryctides hrabei Karaman, 1974
- Psammoryctides lastoschkini Jarošenko, 1948
- Psammoryctides longicapillatus Martínez-Ansemil & Giani, 1983
- Psammoryctides moravicus Hrabě, 1934
- Psammoryctides ochridanus Hrabě, 1931
- Psammoryctides remifer Schmankewicz, 1873
- Psammoryctides stankoi Karaman, 1974
