= Bothrioneurum =

Scientific classification
- Domain: Eukaryota
- Kingdom: Animalia
- Phylum: Annelida
- Clade: Pleistoannelida
- Clade: Sedentaria
- Class: Clitellata
- Order: Tubificida
- Family: Naididae
- Genus: Bothrioneurum; Stolč, 1886

Genus of annelid worms

Bothrioneurum is a genus of annelids belonging to the family Naididae.

The genus was first described by Stolč in 1886.

Synonym: Bothrioneuron Stolč, 1886

Species:

- Bothrioneurum vejdovskyanum
