= Henneguya ictaluri =

Scientific classification
- Kingdom: Animalia
- Phylum: Cnidaria
- Class: Myxosporea
- Order: Bivalvulida
- Family: Myxobolidae
- Genus: Henneguya
- Species: H. ictaluri

Binomial name
- Henneguya ictaluri Pote, Hanson, & Shivaji, 2000

Species of cnidarian parasite

Henneguya ictalyuri is a species of myxozoan parasite in the family Myxobolidae. It infects the channel catfish (Ictalurus punctatus) and is the primary causative agent of proliferative gill disease (PGD), an important parasitic disease of farmed catfish in the southeastern United States.

== Discovery and taxonomy ==
Prior to the formal description of Henneguya ictaluri, the identity of the parasite responsible for proliferative gill disease (PGD) in farmed catfish was uncertain. The disease was suspected to have a myxozoan origin, because parasites that resembled Henneguya sp. were observed in histological samples from catfish with PGD. Later studies instead associated PGD with an actinospore from the genus Aurantiactinomyxon, which was subsequently described as Aurantiactinomyxon ictaluri.

In 2000, researchers found that inoculation of channel catfish with A. ictaluri actinospores resulted in the formation of typical PGD lesions followed by development of Henneguya myxospores in the gills. Analysis of small-subunit ribosomal RNA sequences demonstrated that the actinospore and myxospore represented different stages of the same organism, rather than separate species.

== Description ==
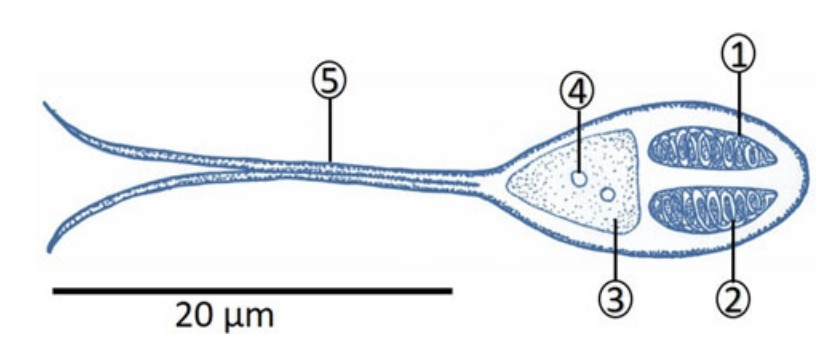
Representative Henneguya myxospore morphology (H. patriciai)

The actinospore of Henneguya ictaluri is an aurantiactinomyxon-type spore with a central spore body and three broad, wing-like processes. These processes aid in buoyancy after the actinospores are released into the water by the oligochaete host. The mature myxospore, or spore, of H. ictaluri is similar to other members of the genus Henneguya, with an elongated spore body, two polar capsules, and two long caudal processes.

=== Relationship to other cnidarians ===
Despite its microscopic parasitic form and like all other myxozoans, H. ictaluri is an animal belonging to the phylum Cnidaria, which also contains jellyfish, corals, and sea anemones. Myxozoans are highly reduced cnidarians whose transition to obligate parasitism was accompanied by extensive reduction of their ancestral body plan and genome. Their relationship with other cnidarians is supported by molecular and phylogenomic studies and by the polar capsule, a distinctive structure that closely resembles the nematocyst, or stinging capsule, of other cnidarians.

== Life cycle ==
Henneguya ictaluri has a two-host life cycle involving the channel catfish and the freshwater oligochaete, Dero digitata. The annelid worm, Dero digitata, serves as the definitive host of H. ictaluri. Within the worm, the parasite undergoes asexual reproduction before developing into actinospores, which are shed in the feces. Mature actinospores have three winglike processes that provide buoyancy, allowing them to float in the water to eventually infect catfish. The actinospore stage has a brief infectious window, with infectivity decreasing substantially after one day.

Channel catfish (Ictalurus punctatus), the fish host of H. ictaluri.

Actinospores enter the catfish host through several portals of entry, including the stomach, buccal cavity, and gills. Following the initial infection, H. ictaluri spreads systemically throughout the catfish; however, developmental progression appears to only occur in parasites localized to the gills. At 24 hours, parasites are found primarily in the gastric mucosa and submucosa, but are also present in several other tissues and in the circulatory system. By 48 to 72 hours, parasite numbers begin decreasing in most organs and the remaining organisms appear to degenerate, while those in the gills continue to develop. By 96 hours post infection, parasites are found only in the gills, indicating the gills are the preferred site of development.

In the gills, H. ictaluri undergoes further development and eventually forms plasmodia containing mature myxospores. Mature myxospores are released from infected fish, eventually infecting D. digitata, completing the two-host life cycle.

== Host susceptibility ==
Susceptibility to Henneguya ictaluri differs among catfish species. Channel catfish are highly susceptible to infection, while blue catfish (Ictalurus furcatus) are largely resistant and generally eliminate the parasite before it develops into plasmodia. Hybrid catfish produced from female channel catfish and male blue catfish can also become infected, but parasite development is reduced compared to channel catfish.

== Proliferative gill disease ==
Henneguya ictaluri is the primary etiologic agent of proliferative gill disease (PGD) in farm-raised channel catfish. PGD is a significant cause for economic loss in the aquaculture industry in the southeastern United States. The characteristic swelling and hemorrhage are known as hamburger gill disease, because affected gills have the appearance of raw hamburger meat. Damaged gills cannot efficiently extract oxygen from the water, causing affected fish to exhibit severe respiratory distress or die, even when dissolved oxygen concentrations would normally be sufficient. Mortality of as high as 100% has been reported in severe PGD outbreaks.

PGD differs from most myxozoan diseases of fish in that clinical disease occurs as a result of initial parasite penetration and proliferation rather than during maturation of the myxospore stage. The severity of PGD is influenced by continued exposure to the parasite, as fish transferred from infectious to parasite-free water showed a substantial recovery of damaged gill tissue.

A real-time qPCR assay has been developed to detect H. ictaluri.
