= University of Pristina (disambiguation) =

University of Pristina is a higher education institution founded in Pristina in 1969.

University of Pristina may also refer to:

- University of Priština (North Mitrovica), a parallel institution under Serbian administration (located in North Mitrovica, Kosovo)
- University of Pristina (1969–99), the institution before the war
