= René-Édouard Claparède =

Swiss anatomist

René-Édouard Claparède (French: [klapaʁɛd]; 24 April 1832, Chancy – 31 May 1871, Siena) was a Swiss anatomist.

The Claparède family was Protestant and originally from Languedoc. They moved to Geneva after Louis XIV's Edict of Fontainebleau in 1685.

He received his education in Geneva and Berlin, where he attended lectures given by Johannes Peter Müller. Later on, he served as an assistant to François Jules Pictet de la Rive at the Geneva Academy, where in 1862 he became a professor of comparative anatomy. He was a regular contributor to the Archives des sciences physiques et naturelles.

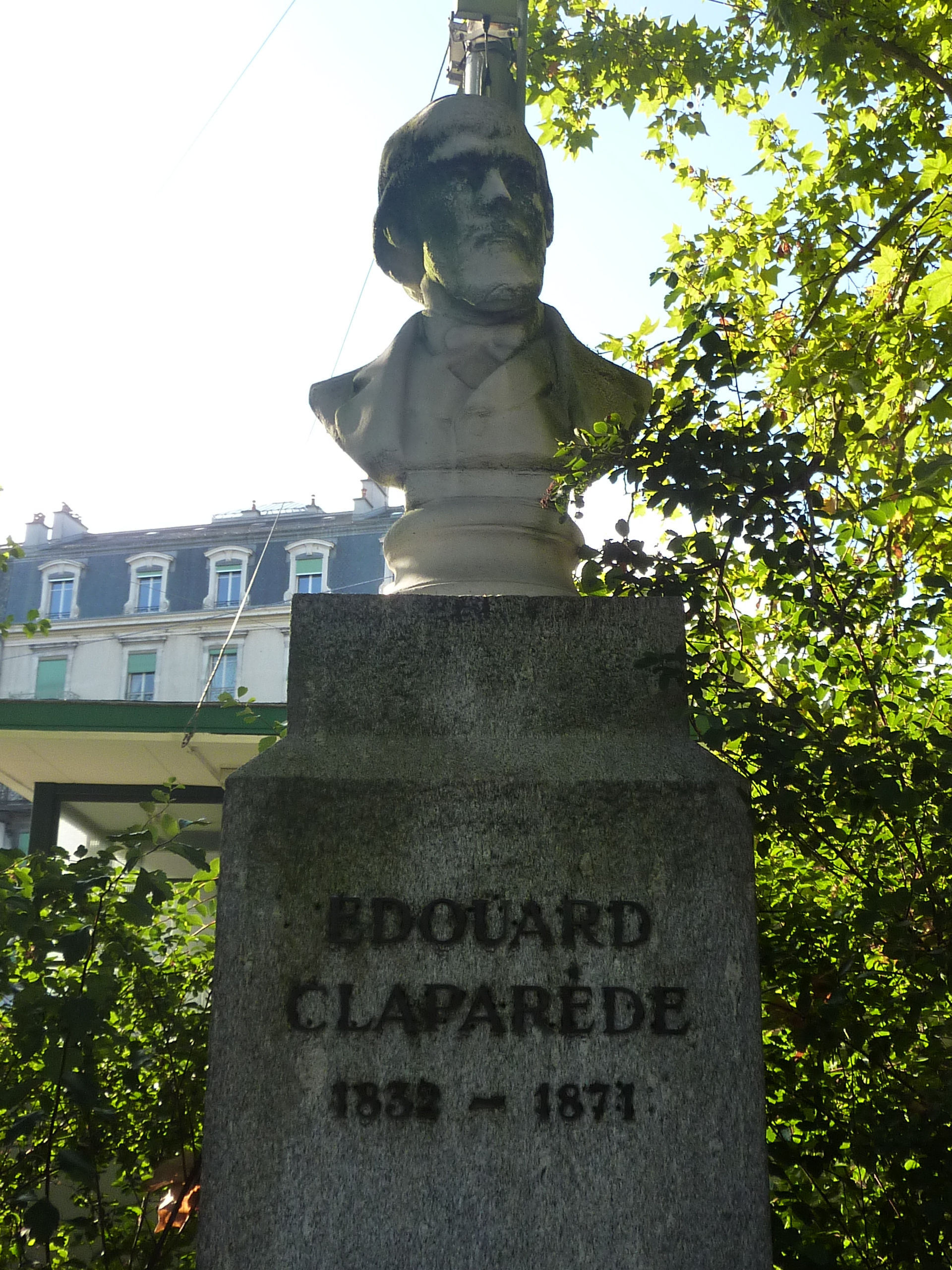
Statue of René-Édouard Claparède, at place Claparède in Geneva

His main research dealt with the structure of infusoria, the anatomy of annelids, the histology of earthworms, the embryology of arthropods and the evolution of spiders. Species with the epithet of claparedii commemorate his name, an example being the sea anemone Edwardsia claparedii. Claparède stressed the importance of studying and illustrating living or recently killed organisms and he did not deposit any museum specimens. He died aged 39 from tuberculosis.

== Selected works ==
- Anatomie und Entwicklungsgeschichte der Neritina fluviatilis, 1857 – Anatomy and developmental history of Neritina fluviatilis.
- Études sur les infusoires et les rhizopodes, 1858 (with Johannes Lachmann) – Studies of infusoria and rhizopods.
- De la formation et de la fécondation des œufs chez les vers nématodes, 1859 – The formation and egg fertilization in nematode worms.
- Recherches sur l'evolution des araignées, 1862 – Research on the evolution of spiders.
- Recherches anatomiques sur les oligochètes, 1862 – Anatomical research on Oligochaeta.
- Beobachtungen über Anatomie und Entwicklungsgeschichte wirbelloser Thiere an der Küste von Normandie, 1863 – Observations on the anatomy and evolution of invertebrates from the coast of Normandy.
- Les annelides chétopodes du Golfe de Naples, 1868 – On Chaetopoda annelids from the Gulf of Naples.
- Recherches sur la structure des annélides sédentaires, 1873 – Research on the structure of sedentary annelids.

== See also ==
- Plainpalais
