= Christer Erséus =

Swedish zoologist, born 1951 specialising in worms

Christer Erséus, born 1951 in Borås, is a Swedish zoologist. He defended his doctoral dissertation in 1980 at the University of Gothenburg, where in 1991 he became professor of zoology and director of studies in zoomorphology and systematics.

Prior to becoming professor at Gothenburg he worked at the Department of Invertebrate Zoology (NRM) at the Swedish Museum of Natural History. His doctoral dissertation treated the ringworm group Clitellata. Over the years, he has described over 500 new species of oligochaetes (Clitellata), and has published over 200 scientific articles on Clitellata. Christer Erséus is considered one of the world's leading experts in the group of worms.

His zoological author abbreviation is Erséus.

== See also ==
- Taxa named by Christer Erséus.
