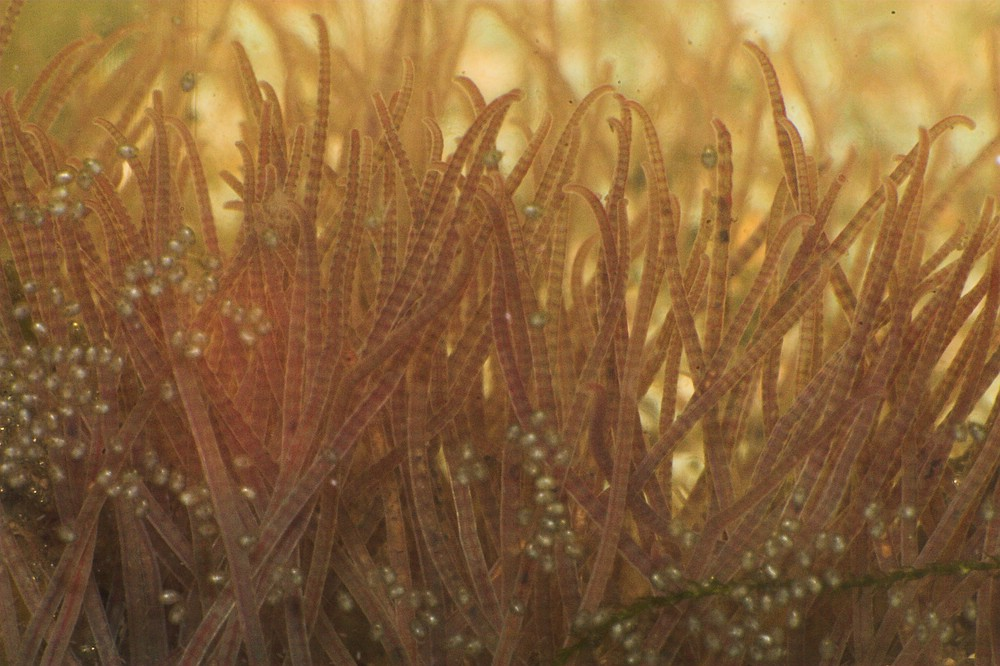
- Tubifex
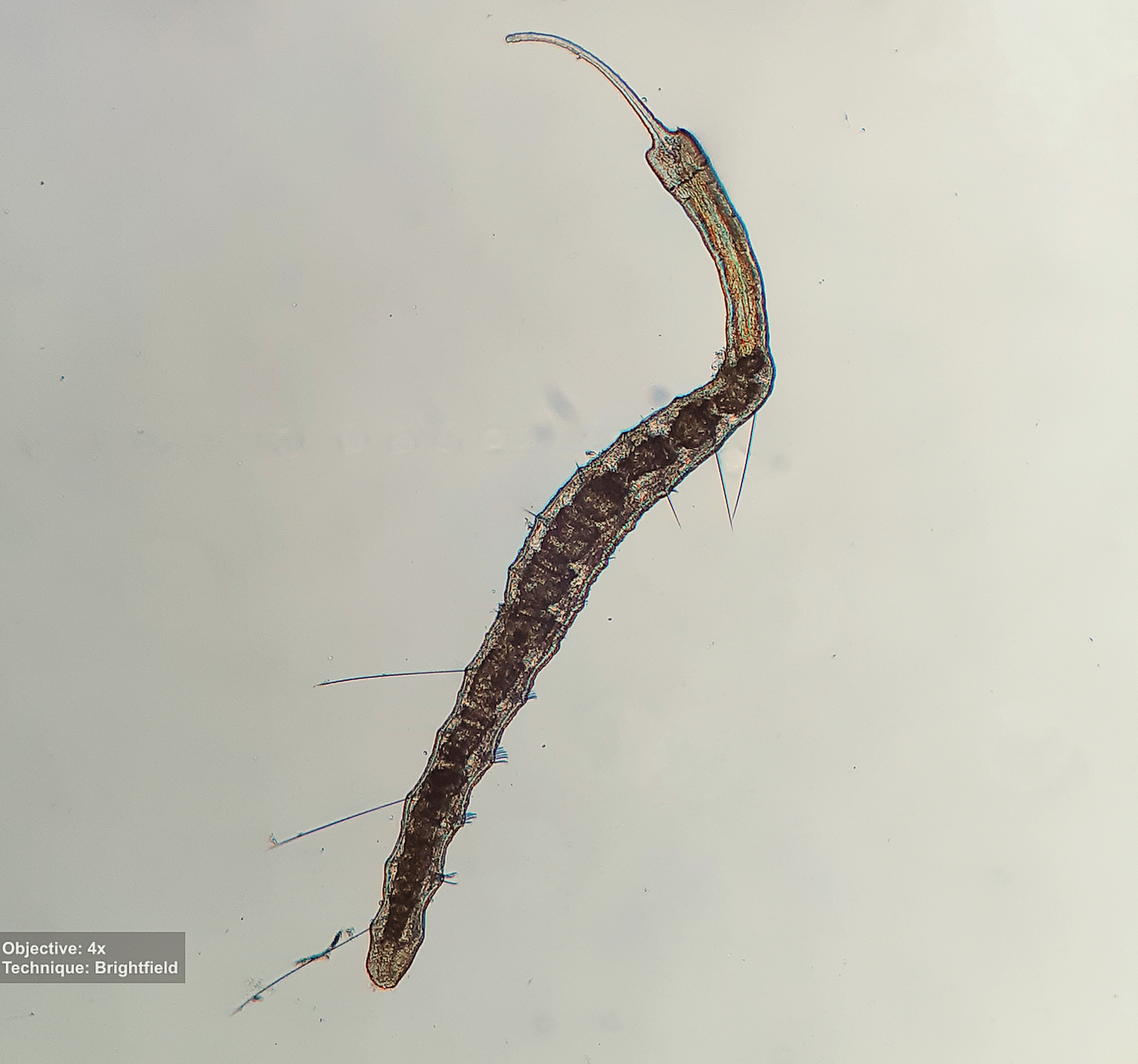
- Stylaria lacustris

Scientific classification
- Kingdom: Animalia
- Phylum: Annelida
- Clade: Pleistoannelida
- Clade: Sedentaria
- Class: Clitellata
- Order: Tubificida
- Suborder: Tubificina
- Family: Naididae; Ehrenberg, 1828

Subfamilies
- Limnodriloidinae; Naidinae; Phallodrilinae; Pristininae (disputed); Rhyacodrilinae; Telmatodrilinae; Tubificinae

Synonyms
- Tubificidae Vejdovský, 1876

= Naididae =

Family of annelids in the order Haplotaxida

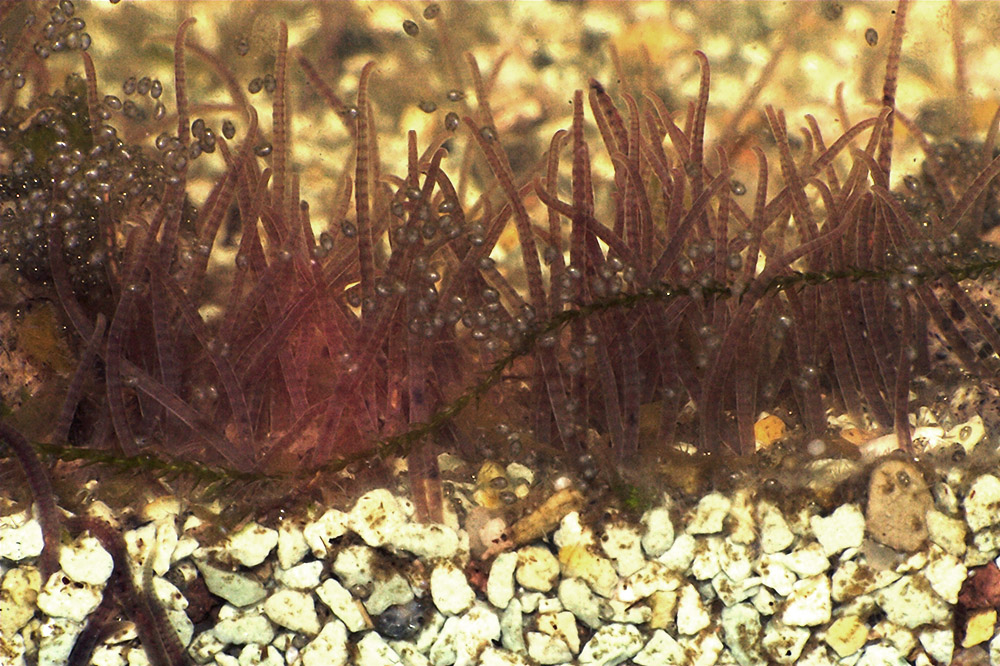

The Naididae (including the former family Tubificidae) are a family of clitellate oligochaete worms like the sludge worm, Tubifex tubifex. They are key components of the benthic communities of many freshwater and marine ecosystems. In freshwater aquaria they may be referred to as detritus worms.

== Description ==
These worms can vary in size, from centimeters to millimeters, depending on the subfamily. They are all hermaphroditic and lack a larval stage.

== Taxonomy ==
Analysis of 18S rDNA sequences revealed that the traditional family Tubificidae is not monophyletic, with the traditionally circumscribed Naididae nested within tubificid taxa. To avoid paraphyly the naidid and tubificid taxa were included in a combined family, which took the name Naididae because it has priority under International Code of Zoological Nomenclature rules as the senior synonym of Tubificidae. A proposal to the International Commission on Zoological Nomenclature to suppress Naididae, because the "tubificids" are the more well-known group of the two, was rejected.

The family Naididae is divided into six subfamilies, arranged here in the presumed phylogenetic sequence:

- Tubificinae Eisen, 1879, containing (among others) the genus Tubifex
- Naidinae Ehrenberg, 1828
- Telmatodrilinae Eisen, 1879
- Limnodriloidinae Erséus, 1982
- Phallodrilinae Brinkhurst, 1971
- Pristininae Lastočkin, 1921, often included in Naidinae
- Rhyacodrilinae Hrabě, 1963

== Presence in aquariums ==
In an aquarium, numbers of naididae can increase rapidly. When their population becomes high, the worms migrate toward the surface of the water for access to higher concentrations of oxygen. Although detritus worms may not cause harm to aquarium fish, their appearance is an indication of poor water quality mainly due to overfeeding and lack of good water sanitation.

Improvement of water quality, filtration, gravel cleaning, and the reduction of feeding, may be performed to bring detritus worm population back to normal. Detritus worms feed on excess food and waste, thereby contributing to the ecosystem of an aquarium.

== Gallery ==
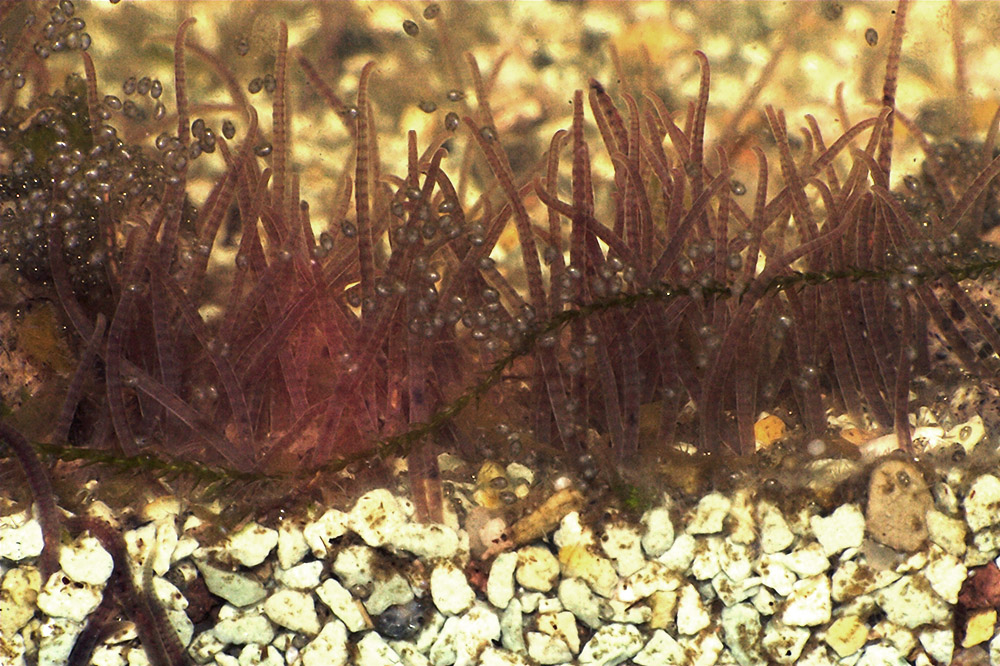
Tubifex in sediment

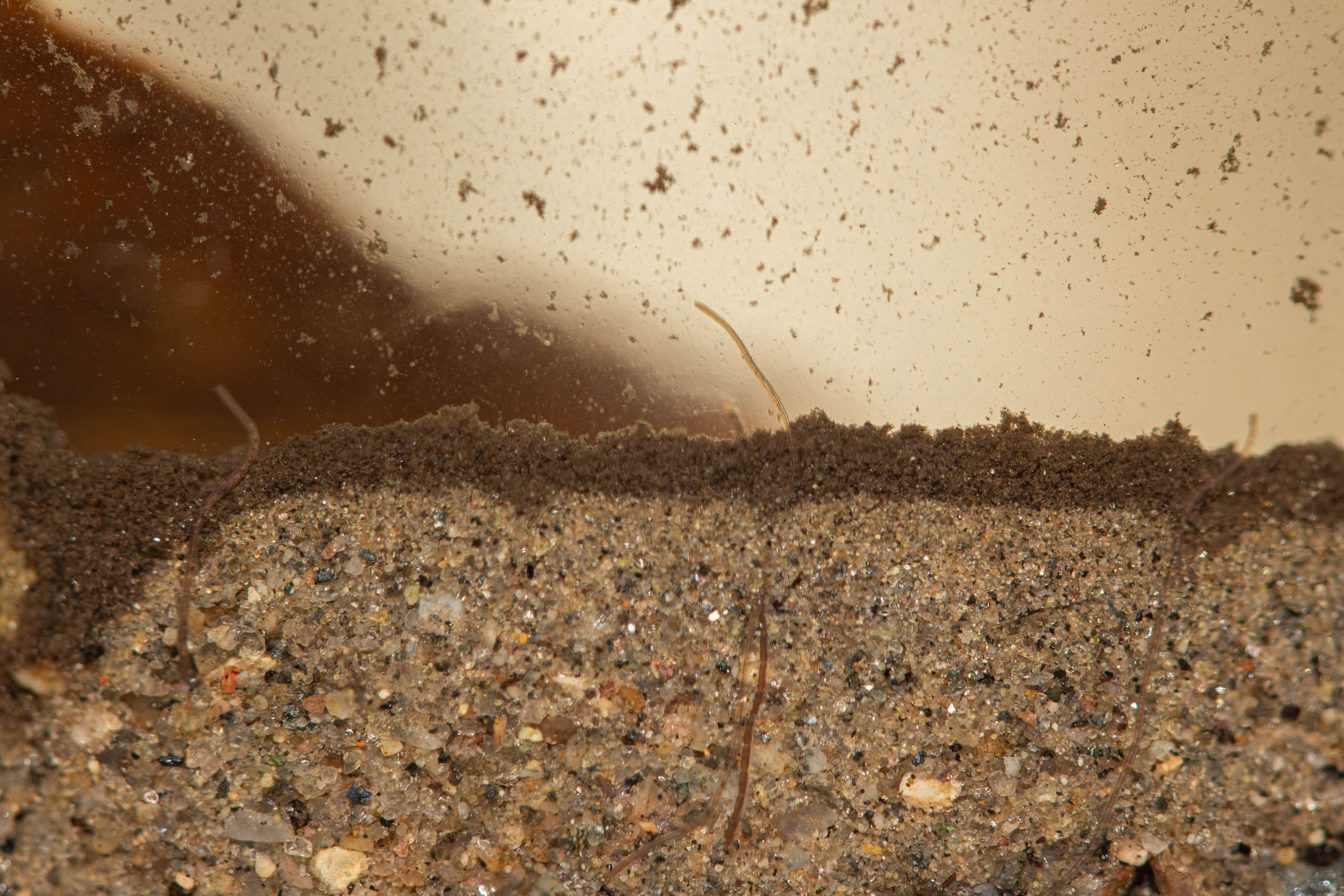
Naididae in sediment - subject from Muddy River, Boston

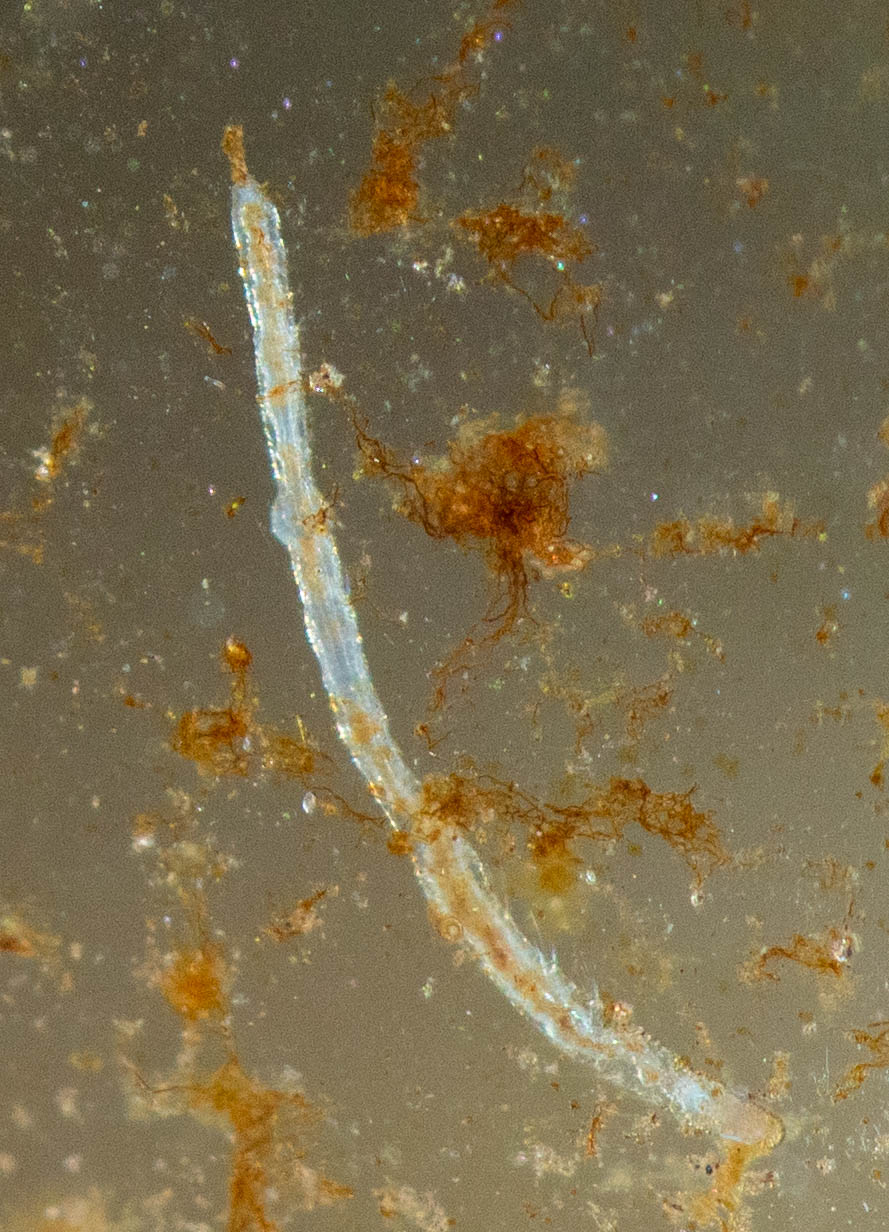
Naididae swimming - subject from Muddy River, Boston

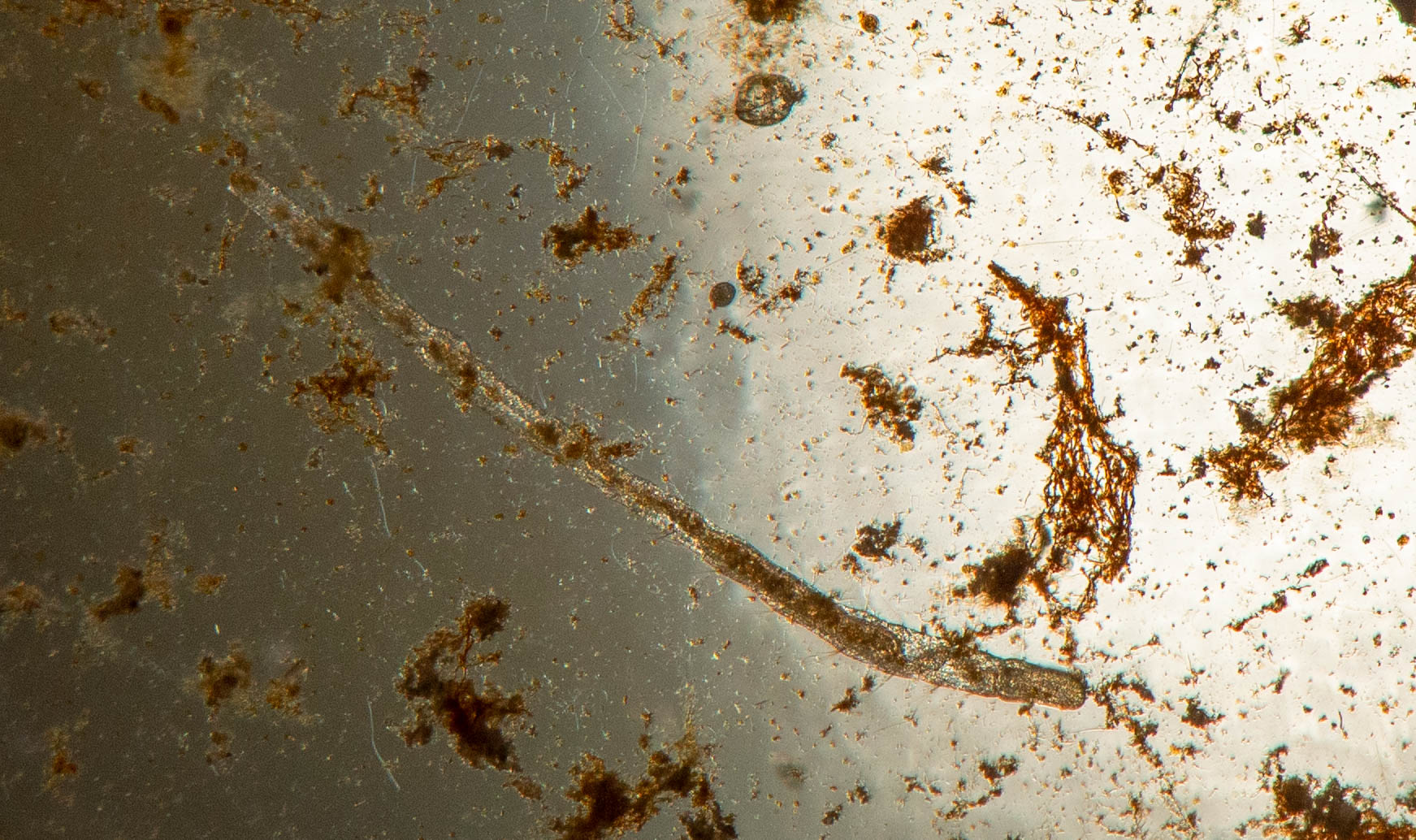
Naididae swimming - subject from Muddy River, Boston
