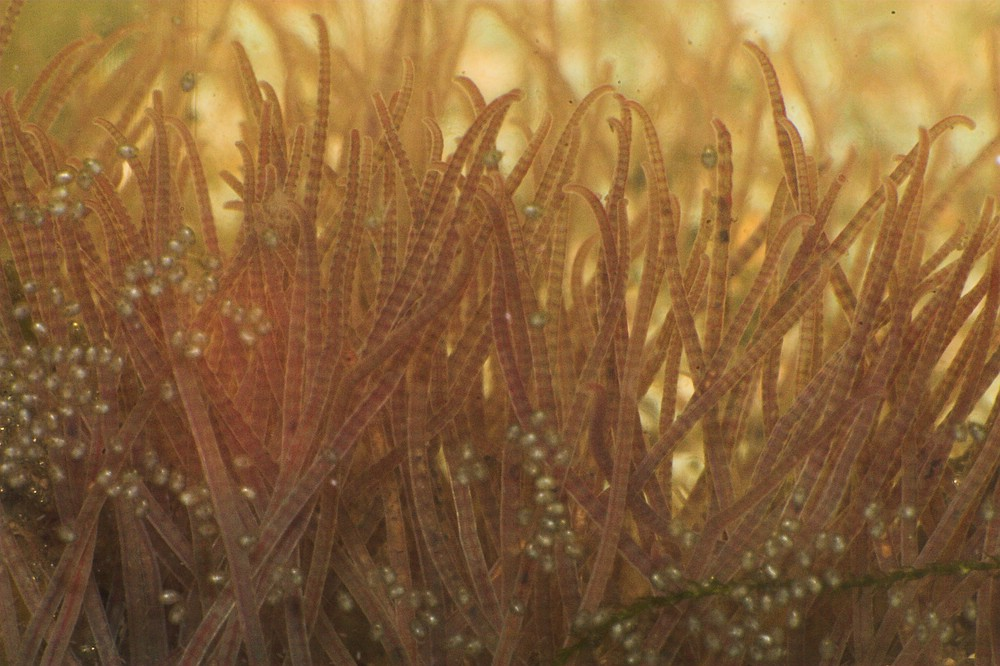

Scientific classification
- Domain: Eukaryota
- Kingdom: Animalia
- Phylum: Annelida
- Clade: Pleistoannelida
- Clade: Sedentaria
- Class: Clitellata
- Subclass: Oligochaeta
- Order: Tubificida

= Tubificida =

Order of annelid worms

Tubificida is an order of annelids belonging to the class Clitellata.

Families:

- Dorydrilidae
- Naididae Ehrenberg, 1828
- Narapidae
- Opistocystidae Cernosvitov, 1936
- Parvidrilidae Erséus, 1999
- Phreodrilidae
- Propappidae Coates, 1986
