= Phallodrilinae =

Scientific classification
- Kingdom: Animalia
- Phylum: Annelida
- Clade: Pleistoannelida
- Clade: Sedentaria
- Class: Clitellata
- Order: Tubificida
- Family: Naididae
- Subfamily: Phallodrilinae; Brinkhurst, 1971

Genera
- See text

Subfamily of annelid

Phallodrilinae is a subfamily of clitellate oligochaete worms.

== Genera ==
The following genera are currently accepted within the subfamily Phallodrilinae.

- Aberrantidrilus Martin, 2015
- Abyssidrilus Erséus, 1992
- Adelodrilus Cook, 1969
- Aktedrilus Knöllner, 1935
- Albanidrilus Erséus, 1992
- Atlantidrilus Erséus, 1982
- Bathydrilus Cook, 1970
- Bermudrilus Erséus, 1979
- Coralliodrilus Erséus, 1979
- Duridrilus Erséus, 1983
- Gianius Erséus, 1992
- Inanidrilus Erséus, 1979
- Inermidrilus Erséus, 1992
- Jamiesoniella Erséus, 1981
- Marionidrilus Erséus, 1992
- Mexidrilus Erséus, 1992
- Milliganius Erséus, 1992
- Mitinokuidrilus Takashima & Mawatari, 1998
- Nootkadrilus Baker, 1982
- Olavius Erséus, 1984
- Pacifidrilus Erséus, 1992
- Paraktedrilus Erséus, 1992
- Pectinodrilus Erséus, 1992
- Peosidriloides Erséus & Milligan, 1994
- Peosidrilus Baker & Erséus, 1979
- Phallodriloides Erséus, 1992
- Phallodrilus Pierantoni, 1902
- Pirodriloides Erséus, 1992
- Pirodrilus Erséus, 1992
- Pseudospiridion Erséus, 1992
- Somalidrilus Erséus, 1992
- Spiridion Knöllner, 1935
- Thalassodrilus Brinkhurst, 1963
- Uniporodrilus Erséus, 1979
