= Marine microbiome =

Community of microorganisms found in or around specific marine environments

All animals on Earth form associations with microorganisms, including protists, bacteria, archaea, fungi, and viruses. In the ocean, animal–microbial relationships were historically explored in single host–symbiont systems. However, new explorations into the diversity of marine microorganisms associating with diverse marine animal hosts is moving the field into studies that address interactions between the animal host and a more multi-member microbiome. The potential for microbiomes to influence the health, physiology, behavior, and ecology of marine animals could alter current understandings of how marine animals adapt to change, and especially the growing climate-related and anthropogenic-induced changes already impacting the ocean environment.

In the oceans, it is challenging to find eukaryotic organisms that do not live in close relationship with a microbial partner. Host-associated microbiomes also influence biogeochemical cycling within ecosystems with cascading effects on biodiversity and ecosystem processes. The microbiomes of diverse marine animals are currently under study, from simplistic organisms including sponges and ctenophores to more complex organisms such as sea squirts and sharks.

== Background ==
Deep-sea hydrothermal vent

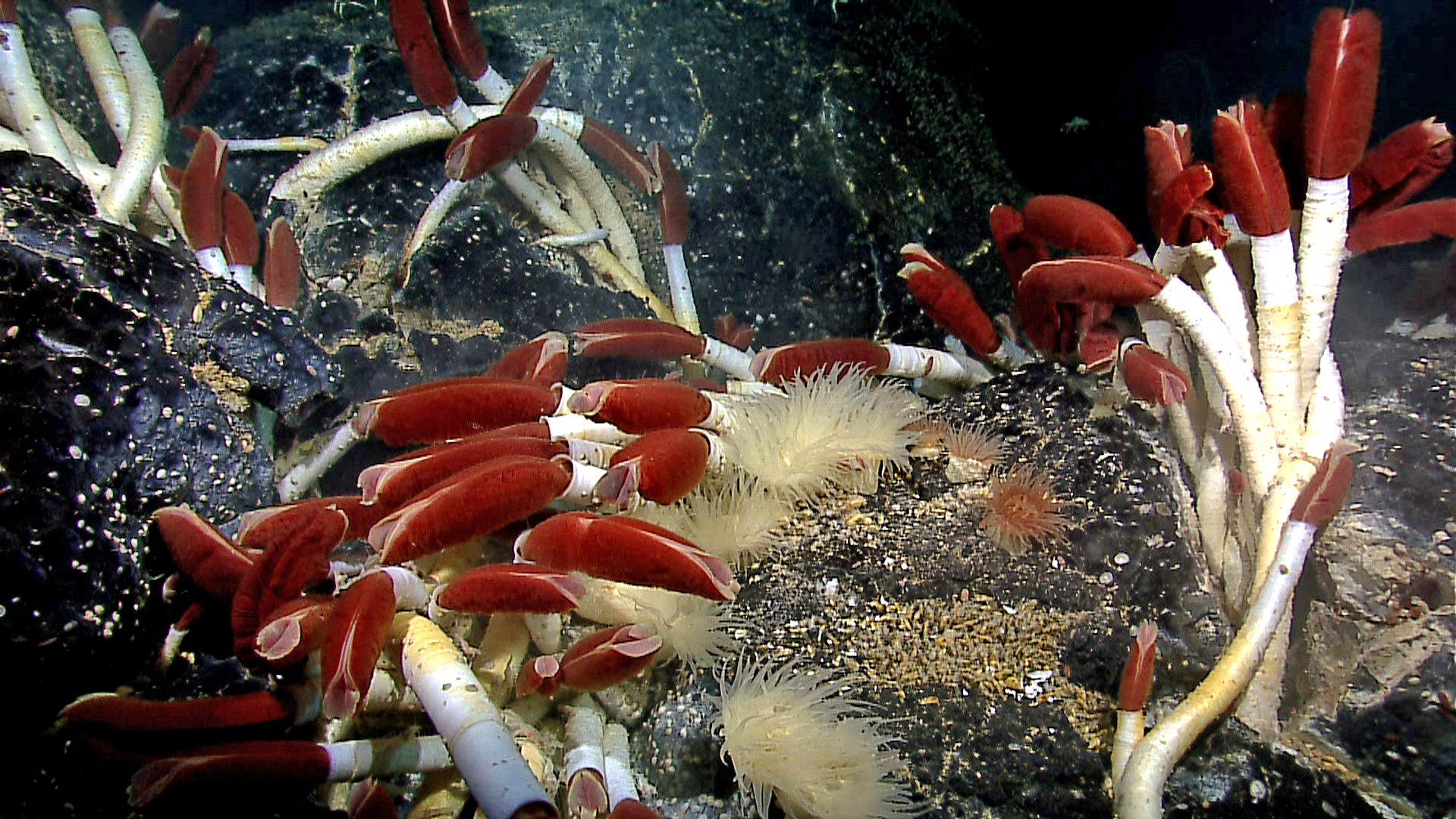
Giant tube worms depend on symbiotic bacteria in their midgut for sustenance

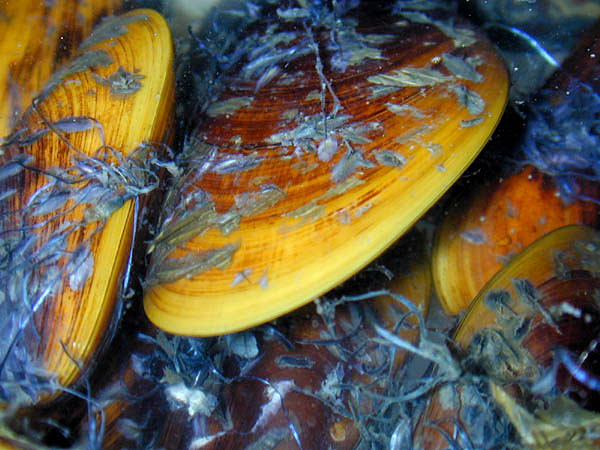
The deepwater mussel Bathymodiolus childressi depends on intracellular methanotrophic bacteria in its gills as a source of carbon

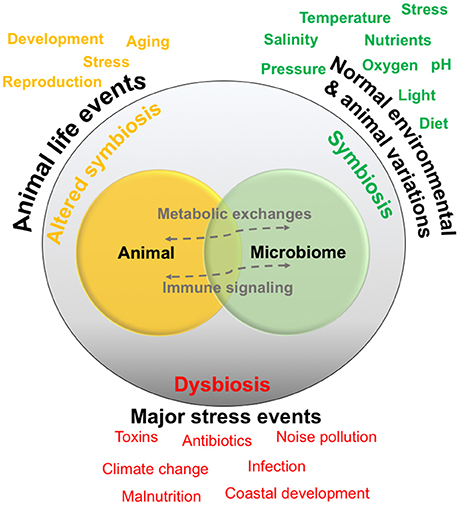
Marine animal host-microbiome relationship Relationships are generally thought to exist in a symbiotic state, and are normally exposed to environmental and animal-specific factors that may cause natural variations. Some events may change the relationship into a functioning but altered symbiotic state, whereas extreme stress events may cause dysbiosis or a breakdown of the relationship and interactions.

Within the vast biological diversity that inhabits the world's oceans, it would be challenging to find a eukaryotic organism that does not live in close relationship with a microbial partner. Such symbioses, i.e., persistent interactions between host and microbe in which none of the partners gets harmed and at least one of them benefits, are ubiquitous from shallow reefs to deep-sea hydrothermal vents. Studies on corals, sponges, and mollusks have revealed some of the profoundly important symbiotic roles microbes play in the lives of their hosts. These studies, however, have tended to focus on a small number of specific microbial taxa. In contrast, most hosts retain groups of many hundreds of different microbes (i.e., a microbiome, which themselves can vary throughout the ontogeny of the host and as a result of environmental perturbations. Rather than host-associated microbes functioning independently, complex multi-assemblage microbiomes have major impact on the fitness and function of their hosts. Studying these complex interactions and biological outcomes is difficult, but to understand the origin and evolution of organisms and populations and the structure and function of communities and ecosystems, the understanding of symbioses in host–microbiome systems needs advancing.

There are many outstanding questions in ecology and evolution that could be addressed by expanding the phylogenetic and ecological breadth of host-associated microbiome studies, including all possible interactions throughout the microbiome. There is strong empirical evidence and new consensus that biodiversity (i.e., the richness of species and their interactions) pervasively influences the functioning of Earth's ecosystems, including ecosystem productivity. However, this research has focused almost exclusively on macroorganisms. Because microbial symbionts are integral parts of most living organisms, the understanding of how microbial symbionts contribute to host performance and adaptability needs broadening.

== Foundations of productive ecosystems ==
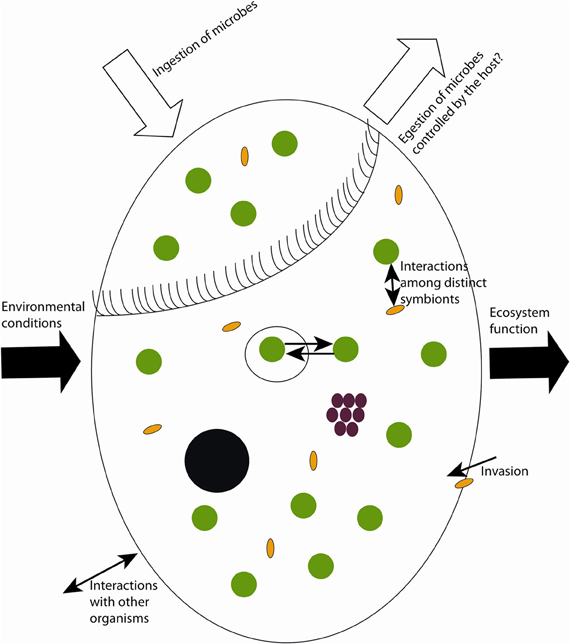
Possible dynamics in symbiosis with aquatic ciliates as host Black circle: macronucleus, white big circle: food vacuoles, green circles: phototrophs, brown circles: chemoautotrophs, yellow ovals: heterotrophic prokaryotes

Ecosystem engineers, such as many types of corals, deep-sea mussels, and hydrothermal vent tubeworms, contribute to primary productivity and create the structural habitats and nutrient resources that are the foundation of their respective ecosystems. All of these taxa engage in mutualistic nutritional symbioses with microbes. There are many examples of marine nutritional mutualisms in which microbes enable hosts to utilize resources or substrates otherwise unavailable to the host alone. Such symbioses have been described in detail in reduced and anoxic sediments (e.g., lucinid clams, stilbonematid nematodes, and gutless oligochaetes) and hydrothermal vents (e.g., the giant tube worm or deep-sea mussels). Moreover, many foundational species of marine macroalgae are vitamin auxotrophs (for example, half of more than 300 surveyed species were unable to synthesize cobalamin), and their productivity depends on provisioning from their epiphytic bacteria. Reefs often consist of stony corals, one of the most well-known examples of a mutualistic symbiosis, in which the dinoflagellate alga Symbiodiniaceae supplies the coral with glucose, glycerol, and amino acids, while the coral provides the algae with a protected environment and limiting compounds (e.g., nitrogen species) needed for photosynthesis. However, this is a classic example of a mutualistic symbiosis that is sensitive to environmental disturbances, which can disrupt the fragile interactions between host and microbe. When reefs become warm and eutrophic, mutualistic Symbiodiniaceae may induce cellular damage to the host and/or sequester more resources for their own growth, thereby injuring and parasitizing their hosts. Reef fishes, which seek homes on coral reefs, are important in fostering coral recovery in the wake of disturbance. Epulopiscium bacteria in the guts of surgeonfishes produce enzymes that allow their hosts to digest complex polysaccharides, enabling the host fish to feed on tough, leathery red and brown macroalgae. This trophic innovation has facilitated niche diversification among coral reef herbivores. Surgeonfishes are critical to the functioning of Indo-Pacific coral reefs, as they are among the only fishes capable of consuming large macroalgae that bloom in the wake of ecosystem disturbance and suppress coral recovery.

Along with more standard examples of nutritional symbioses in animals, recent advances in genome sequencing technology have led to the discovery of many endosymbiotic associations in marine protists (a protist is a general term to refer to a non-monophyletic collection of unicellular eukaryotes that are not fungi or in the Plantae group) These illustrate the incorporation of various new biochemical functions, such as photosynthesis, nitrogen fixation and recycling, and methanogenesis, into protist hosts by endosymbionts. Endosymbiosis in protists is widespread and represents an important source of innovation. Previously unrecognized metabolic innovations of marine microbial symbioses that are ecologically important are discovered regularly. For example, Candidatus Kentron (a clade of Gammaproteobacteria found in association with ciliates) nourish their ciliate hosts in the genus Kentrophoros and recycle acetate and propionate, which are low-value cellular waste products from their hosts, into biomass. Another example is the anaerobic marine ciliate Strombidium purpureum. The ciliate lives under anaerobic conditions and harbors endosymbiotic purple nonsulfur bacteria that contain both bacteriochlorophyll a and spirilloxanthin. The endosymbionts are photosynthetically active; hence, this symbiosis represents an evolutionary transition of an aerobic organism to an anaerobic one while incorporating organelles.

== Reproduction and host development ==
Extending beyond nutritional symbioses, microbial symbionts can alter the reproduction, development, and growth of their hosts. Specific bacterial strains in marine biofilms often directly control the recruitment of planktonic larvae and propagules, either by inhibiting settlement or by serving as a settlement cue. For example, the settlement of zoospores from the green alga Ulva intestinalis onto the biofilms of specific bacteria is mediated by their attraction to the quorum-sensing molecule, acyl-homoserine lactone, secreted by the bacteria. Classic examples of marine host–microbe developmental dependence include the observation that algal cultures grown in isolation exhibited abnormal morphologies and the subsequent discovery of morphogenesis-inducing compounds, such as thallusin, secreted by epiphytic bacterial symbionts. Bacteria are also known to influence the growth of marine plants, macroalgae, and phytoplankton by secreting phytohormones such as indole acetic acid and cytokinin-type hormones. In the marine choanoflagellate Salpingoeca rosetta, both multicellularity and reproduction are triggered by specific bacterial cues, offering a view into the origins of bacterial control over animal development (reviewed by Woznica and King. The benefit to the bacteria, in return, is that they receive physical space to colonize at particular points in the water column typically accessible only to planktonic microbes. Perhaps the best-studied example of intimate host–microbe interactions controlling animal development is the Hawaiian bobtail squid Euprymna scolopes. It lives in a mutualistic symbiosis with the bioluminescent bacteria Aliivibrio fischeri. The bacteria are fed a solution of sugars and amino acids by the host and, in return, provide bioluminescence for countershading and predator avoidance. This mutualism with microbes provides a selective advantage for the squid in predator–prey interactions. Another invertebrate example can be found in tubeworms, in which Hydroides elegans metamorphosis is mediated by a bacterial inducer and mitogen-activated protein kinase (MAPK) signaling in biofilms.

== Biogeochemical cycling ==
Host-associated microbiomes also influence biogeochemical cycling within ecosystems with cascading effects on biodiversity and ecosystem processes. For example, microbial symbionts comprise up to 40% of the biomass of their sponge hosts. Through a process termed the "sponge-loop," they convert dissolved organic carbon released by reef organisms into particulate organic carbon that can be consumed by heterotrophic organisms. Along with the coral–Symbiodiniaceae mutualism, this sponge-bacterial symbiosis helps explain Darwin's paradox, i.e., how highly productive coral reef ecosystems exist within otherwise oligotrophic tropical seas. Some sponge symbionts play a significant role in the marine phosphorus cycle by sequestering nutrients in the form of polyphosphate granules in the tissue of their host and nitrogen cycling, e.g., through nitrification, denitrification, and ammonia oxidation.]. Many macroalgal-associated bacteria are specifically adapted to degrade complex algal polysaccharides (e.g., fucoidan, porphyran, and laminarin) and modify both the quality and quantity of organic carbon supplied to the ecosystem. The sulfur-oxidizing gill endosymbionts of lucinid clams contribute to primary productivity through chemosynthesis and facilitate the growth of seagrasses (important foundation species) by lowering sulfide concentrations in tropical sediments. Gammaproteobacterial symbionts of lucinid clams and stilbonematid nematodes were also recently shown to be capable of nitrogen fixation (bacterial symbiont genomes encode and express nitrogenase genes, highlighting the role of symbiotic microbes in nutrient cycling in shallow marine systems.

These examples demonstrate the importance of microbial symbioses for the functioning of ocean ecosystems. Understanding symbioses with this same level of detail in the context of complex communities (i.e., whole microbiomes) remains ripe for exploration and, indeed, requires a more integrated framework from the fields of microbiology, evolutionary biology, community ecology, and oceanography. Individual taxa within the microbiome may help hosts withstand a wide range of environmental conditions, including those predicted under scenarios of climate change. Next, we explore two different avenues of how interdisciplinary collaborations could advance this line of research.

== Examples ==
=== Phytoplankton ===
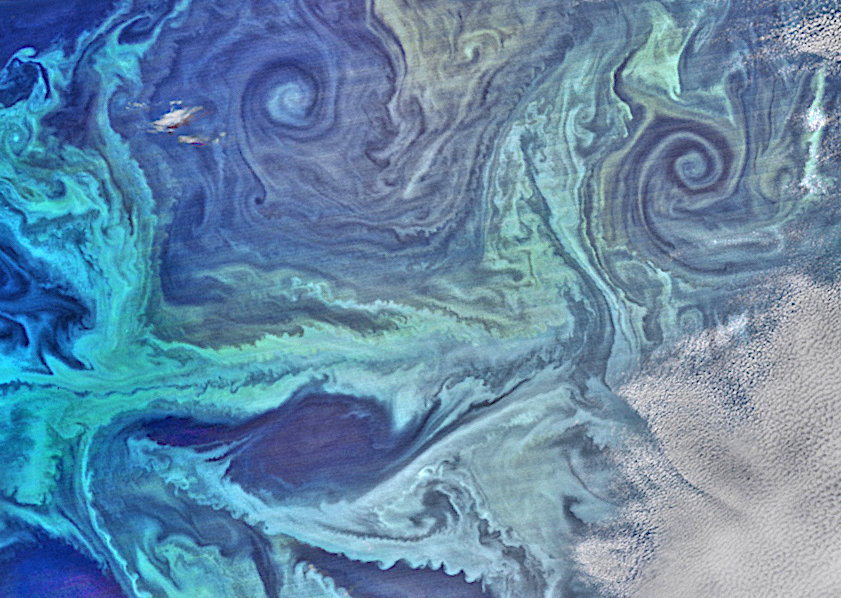
NASA satellite view of a Southern Ocean phytoplankton bloom

A phytoplankton microbiome is the community of microorganisms—mainly bacteria, but also including fungi and viruses—that live in association with phytoplankton. These microbiomes play a critical role in marine ecosystems by supporting phytoplankton health, facilitating nutrient cycling, sustaining food webs, and contributing to climate regulation.

Microbial partners help decompose organic matter and recycle key nutrients like nitrogen and carbon, sustaining primary production and supporting ocean productivity and phytoplankton community structure. Diazotrophic cyanobacteria, for example, fix atmospheric nitrogen, boosting productivity in nutrient-poor waters. As primary producers, phytoplankton absorb CO_{2} through photosynthesis, contributing to the biological carbon pump and long term carbon sequestration.

Phytoplankton–microbiome interactions are central to marine biogeochemical cycles. Microbial diversity influences host physiology and ecosystem functions, while environmental factors such as temperature, nutrient levels, and ocean chemistry shape microbiome composition and function. Chemical signaling—through quorum sensing and infochemicals—regulate microbial behavior, impacting bloom dynamics, symbiosis, and defense mechanisms. Viruses also affect phytoplankton populations by driving nutrient turnover and mediating carbon flow.

=== Corals ===
Corals are one of the more common examples of an animal host whose symbiosis with microalgae can turn to dysbiosis, and is visibly detected as bleaching. Coral microbiomes have been examined in a variety of studies, which demonstrate how variations in the ocean environment, most notably temperature, light, and inorganic nutrients, affect the abundance and performance of the microalgal symbionts, as well as calcification and physiology of the host.

Studies have also suggested that resident bacteria, archaea, and fungi additionally contribute to nutrient and organic matter cycling within the coral, with viruses also possibly playing a role in structuring the composition of these members, thus providing one of the first glimpses at a multi-domain marine animal symbiosis. The gammaproteobacterium Endozoicomonas is emerging as a central member of the coral's microbiome, with flexibility in its lifestyle. Given the recent mass bleaching occurring on reefs, corals will likely continue to be a useful and popular system for symbiosis and dysbiosis research.

Astrangia poculata, the northern star coral, is a temperate stony coral, widely documented along the eastern coast of the United States. The coral can live with and without zooxanthellae (algal symbionts), making it an ideal model organism to study microbial community interactions associated with symbiotic state. However, the ability to develop primers and probes to more specifically target key microbial groups has been hindered by the lack of full length 16S rRNA sequences, since sequences produced by the Illumina platform are of insufficient length (approximately 250 base pairs) for the design of primers and probes. In 2019, Goldsmith et al demonstrated Sanger sequencing was capable of reproducing the biologically-relevant diversity detected by deeper next-generation sequencing, while also producing longer sequences useful to the research community for probe and primer design (see diagram on right).

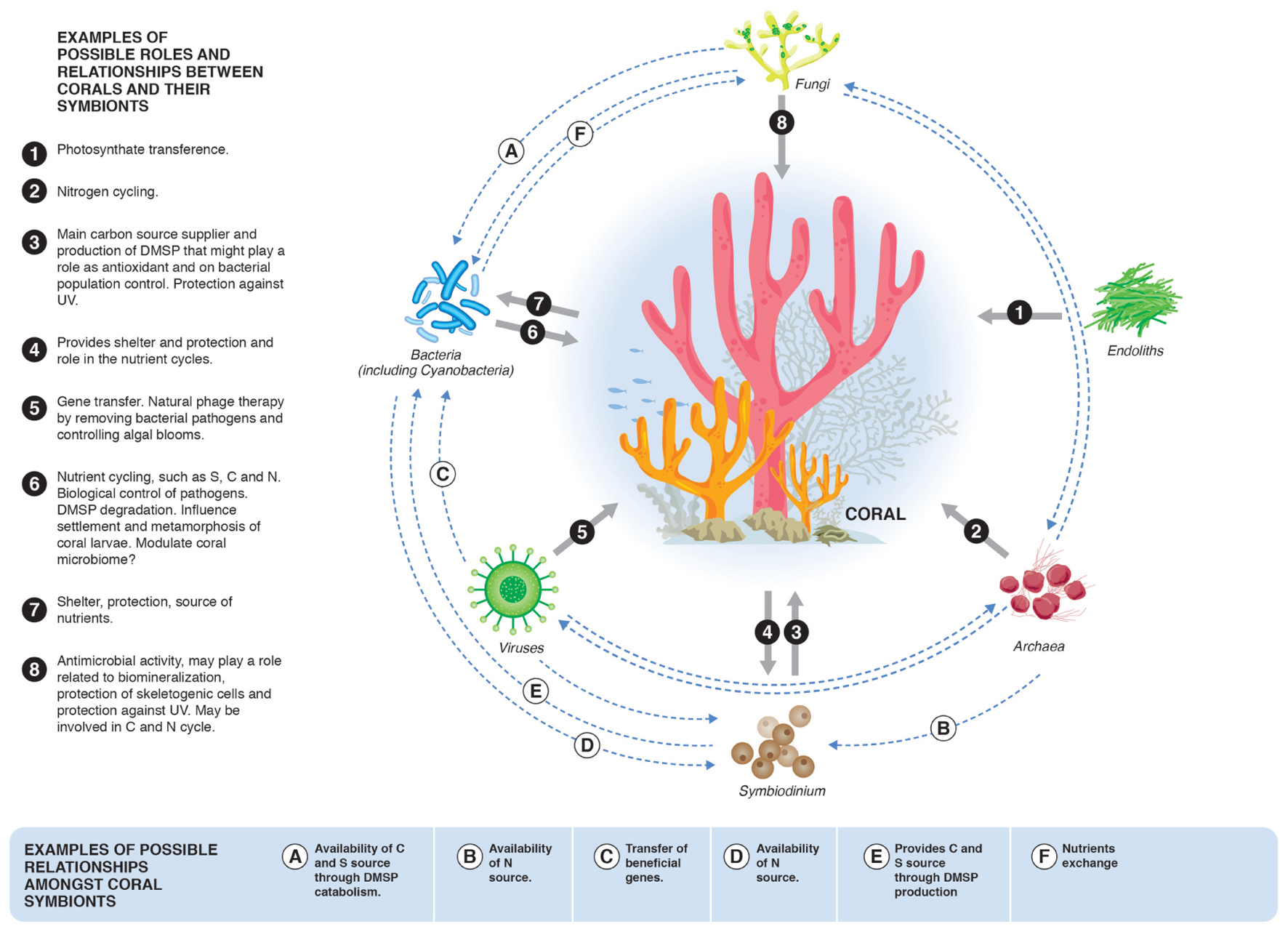
Relationships between corals and their microbial symbionts

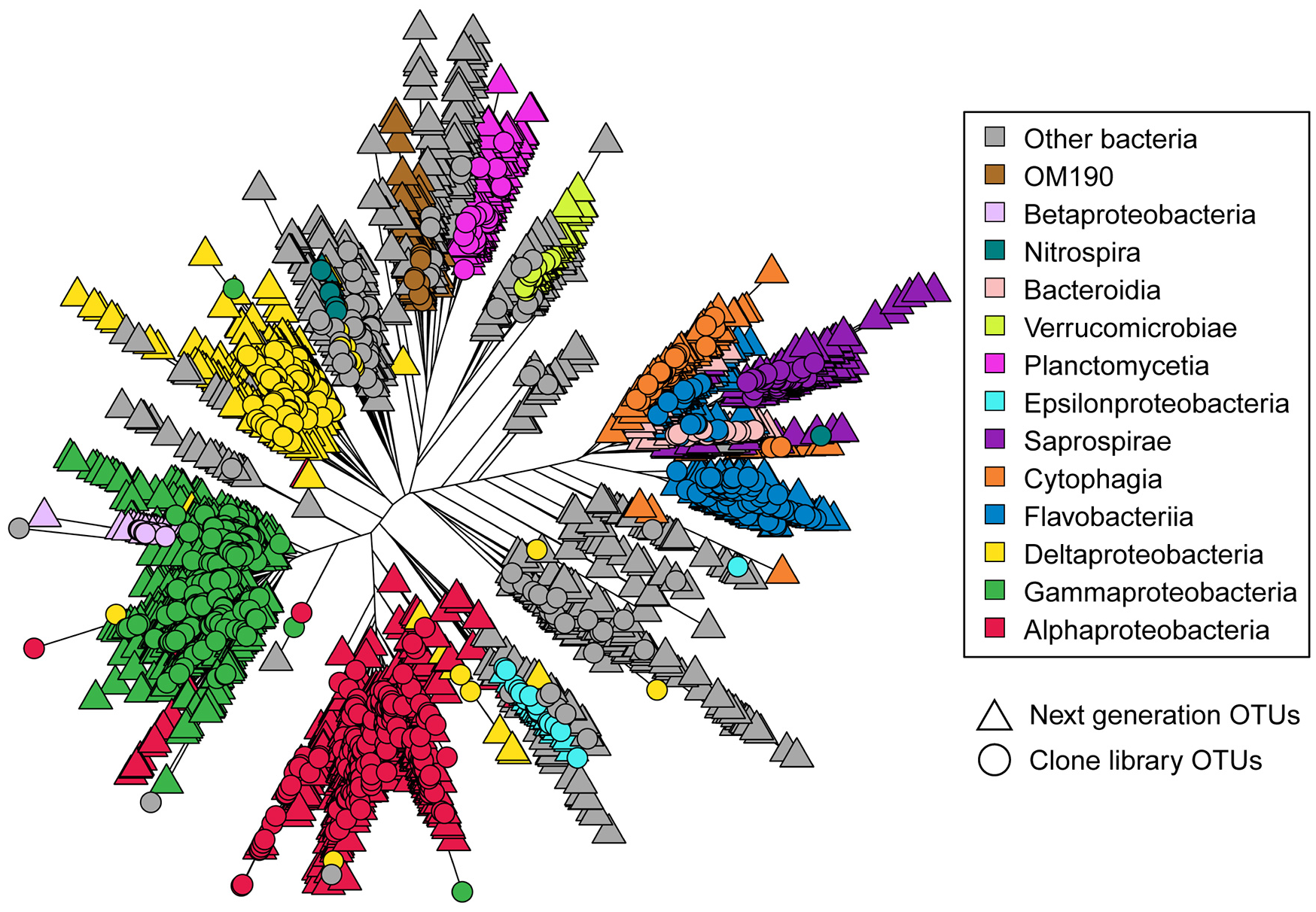
Phylogenetic tree representing bacterial OTUs from clone libraries and next-generation sequencing. OTUs from next-generation sequencing are displayed if the OTU contained more than two sequences in the unrarefied OTU table (3626 OTUs).

=== Sponges ===
Sponges are common members of the ocean's diverse benthic habitats and their abundance and ability to filter large volumes of seawater have led to the awareness that these organisms play critical roles in influencing benthic and pelagic processes in the ocean. They are one of the oldest lineages of animals, and have a relatively simple body plan that commonly associates with bacteria, archaea, algal protists, fungi, and viruses. Sponge microbiomes are composed of specialists and generalists, and complexity of their microbiome appears to be shaped by host phylogeny. Studies have shown that the sponge microbiome contributes to nitrogen cycling in the oceans, especially through the oxidation of ammonia by archaea and bacteria. Most recently, microbial symbionts of tropical sponges were shown to produce and store polyphosphate granules, perhaps enabling the host to survive periods of phosphate depletion in oligotrophic marine environments. The microbiomes of some sponge species do appear to change in community structure in response to changing environmental conditions, including temperature and ocean acidification, as well as synergistic impacts.

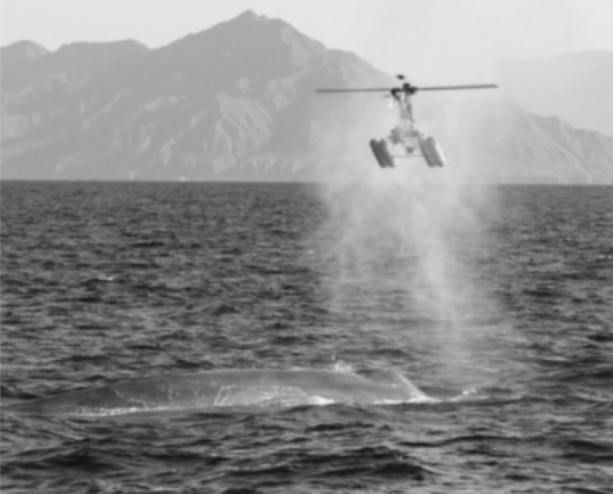
Collecting a sample of blow from a blue whale using a helicopter drone

=== Cetaceans ===
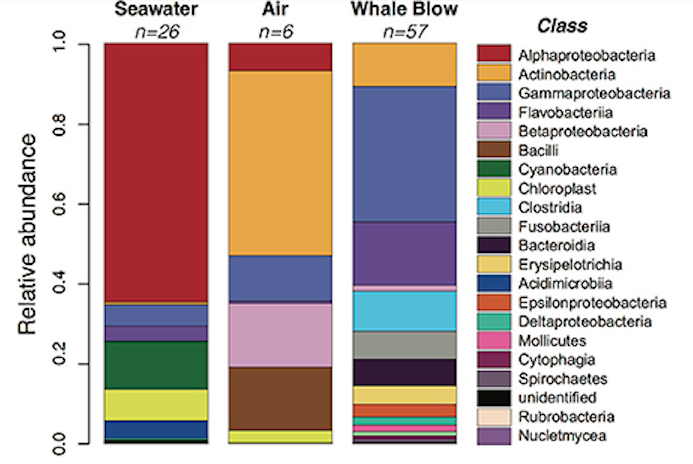
Relative abundance of bacterial classes identified in sampled whale blow, air and seawater.

The access of microbial samples from the gut out of marine mammals is limited because most species are rare, endangered, and deep divers. There are different techniques for sampling the cetacean's gut microbiome. The most common is collecting fecal samples from the environment and taking a probe from the center that is non-contaminated. Besides there are studies from rectal swabs and rare studies from stranded dead or living animals direct from the intestine.

The outermost epidermal layer, i.e. the skin, is the first barrier that protects the individual from the outside world and the epidermal microbiome on it is considered an indicator not only of the health of the animal but is also considered an ecological indicator that shows the state of the surrounding environment. Knowing the microbiome of the skin of marine mammals under ''normal'' conditions has allowed us to understand how these communities are different from the free microbial communities found in the sea and how they can change according to abiotic and biotic variations, and also ''communities vary between healthy and sick individuals''.

Cetaceans are in danger because they are affected by multiple stress factors which make them more vulnerable to various diseases. These animals have been noted to show high susceptibility to airway infections, but very little is known about their respiratory microbiome. Therefore, the sampling of the exhaled breath or "blow" of the cetaceans can provide an assessment of the state of health. Blow is composed of a mixture of microorganisms and organic material, including lipids, proteins, and cellular debris derived from the linings of the airways which, when released into the relatively cooler outdoor air, condense to form a visible mass of vapor, which can be collected. There are various methods for collecting exhaled breath samples, one of the most recent is through the use of aerial drones. This method provides a safer, quieter, and less invasive alternative and often a cost-effective option for monitoring fauna and flora. Once obtained, the blow samples are taken to the laboratory and we proceed with the amplification and sequencing of the respiratory tract microbiota. The use of aerial drones has been more successful with large cetaceans due to slow swim speeds and larger blow sizes.

=== Marine worms ===
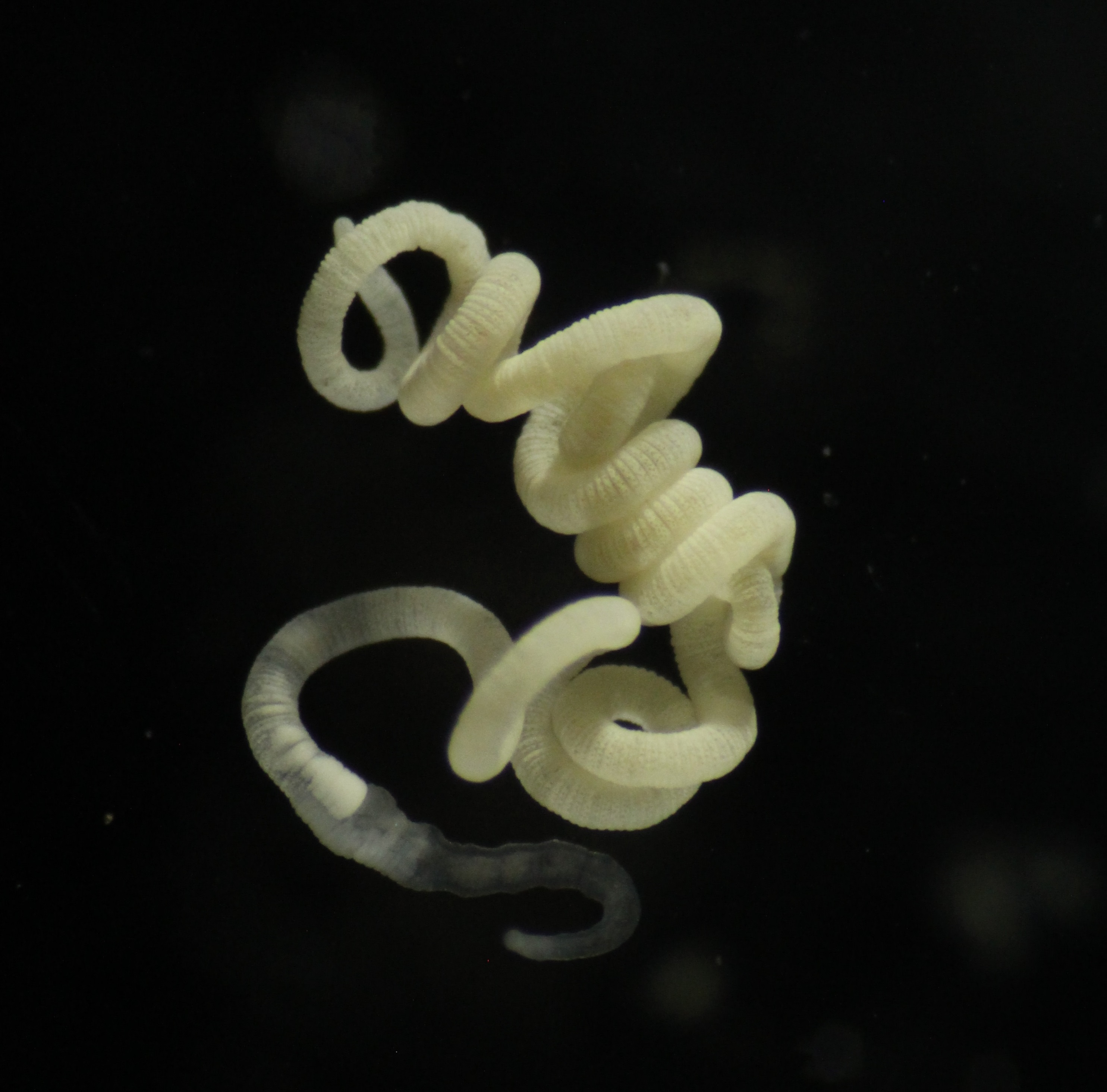
The gutless worm Olavius algarvensis depends on symbiotic bacteria living under its cuticle as its source of food. The bacteria are responsible for the bright white appearance of the worms.

The gutless marine oligochaete worm Olavius algarvensis is another relatively well-studied marine host to microbes. These three centimetre long worms reside within shallow marine sediments of the Mediterranean Sea. The worms do not contain a mouth or a digestive or excretory system, but are instead nourished with the help of a suite of extracellular bacterial endosymbionts that reside upon coordinated use of sulfur present in the environment. This system has benefited from some of the most sophisticated 'omics and visualization tools. For example, multi-labeled probing has improved visualization of the microbiome and transcriptomics and proteomics have been applied to examine host–microbiome interactions, including energy transfer between the host and microbes and recognition of the consortia by the worm's innate immune system. The major strength of this system is that it does offer the ability to study host–microbiome interactions with a low diversity microbial consortium, and it also offers a number of host and microbial genomic resources

=== Other animals ===
The microbiomes of diverse marine animals are currently under study, from simplistic organisms including sponges and ctenophores to more complex organisms such as sea squirts and sharks.

The relationship between the Hawaiian bobtail squid and the bioluminescent bacterium Aliivibrio fischeri is one of the best studied symbiotic relationships in the sea and is a choice system for general symbiosis research. This relationship has provided insight into fundamental processes in animal-microbial symbioses, and especially biochemical interactions and signaling between the host and bacterium.

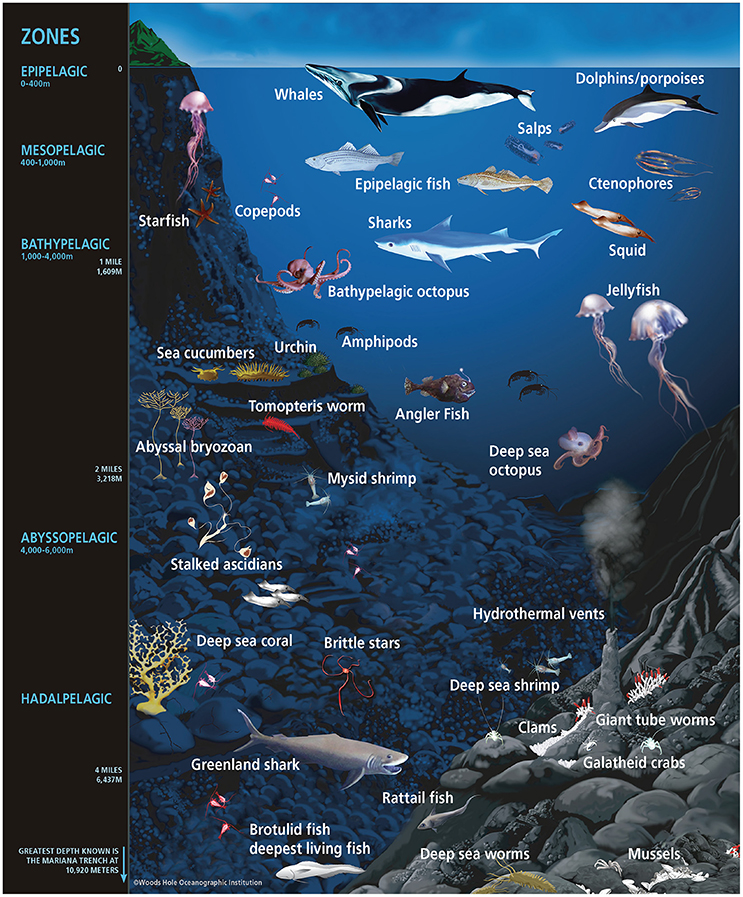
Some representative ocean animal life (not drawn to scale) within their approximate depth-defined ecological habitats. Marine microorganisms exist on the surfaces and within the tissues and organs of the diverse life inhabiting the ocean, across all ocean habitats.

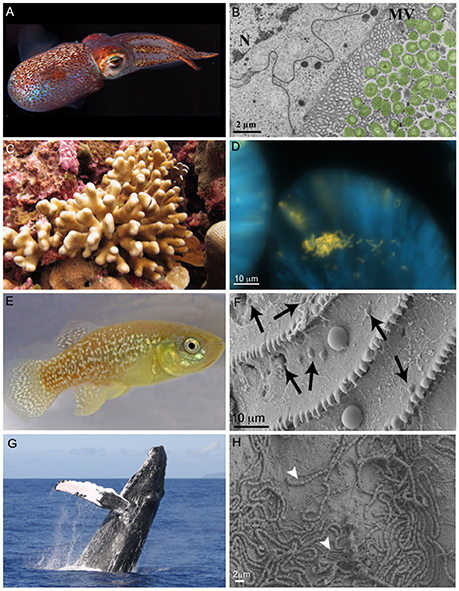
Some marine animals and associated microbiomes (A) Hawaiian bobtail squid and (B) a TEM of Vibrio fischeri cells associating with dense microvilli (MV) and in proximity to the epithelial nucleus (N) within the light organ. (C) the reef-building coral Stylophora pistillata and (D) a microscopy image of Endozoicomonas cells (probed yellow using in situ hybridization) within the tentacles of a S. pistillata host. (E) the Atlantic killifish and (F) a SEM image of the surface and scales of the fish, with arrows pointing to bacterial-sized cells and larger cells (which are not noted) are presumably phytoplankton. (G) a humpback whale breaching and (H) a SEM image of a humpback's skin surface associated bacteria, with arrows indicating two different cell morphologies.

=== Biofouling ===
Some host-associated microbes produce compounds that prevent biofouling and regulate microbiome assembly and maintenance in many marine organisms, including sponges, macroalgae, and corals. For example, tropical corals harbor diverse bacteria in their surface mucus layer that produce quorum-sensing inhibitors and other antibacterial compounds as a defense against colonization and infection by potential microbial pathogens. Epiphytic bacteria of marine macroalgae excrete a diverse chemical arsenal capable of selectively shaping further bacterial colonization and deterring the settlement of biofouling marine invertebrates such as bryozoans. As in corals, these diverse, microbially secreted compounds include not only bactericidal and bacteriostatic antibiotics but also compounds like halogenated furanones, cyclic dipeptides, and acyl-homoserine lactone mimics that disrupt bacterial quorum sensing and inhibit biofilm formation. The bacteria likely are able to utilize the carbon-rich exudates from their hosts. For example, in the case of giant kelp, the alga emits approximately 20% of primary production as dissolved organic carbon. Whereas these prior examples illustrate how the microbiomes can protect hosts from surface colonization, a similar phenomenon has also been observed internally in the shipworm Bankia setacea, in which symbionts produce a boronated tartrolon antibiotic thought to keep the wood-digesting cecum clear of bacterial foulants. By producing antimicrobial compounds, these microbes are able to defend their niche space to prevent other organisms from crowding them out.

== Marine holobionts ==
Reef-building corals are holobionts that include the coral itself (a eukaryotic invertebrate within class Anthozoa), photosynthetic dinoflagellates called zooxanthellae (Symbiodinium), and associated bacteria and viruses. Co-evolutionary patterns exist for coral microbial communities and coral phylogeny.

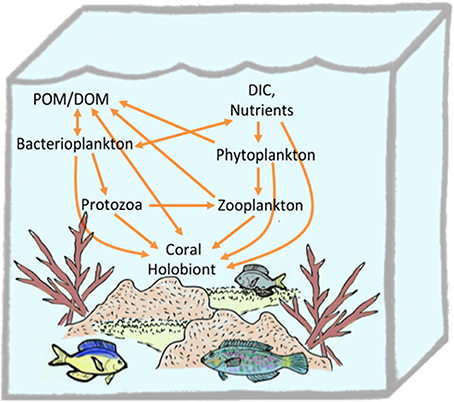
Coral holobiont

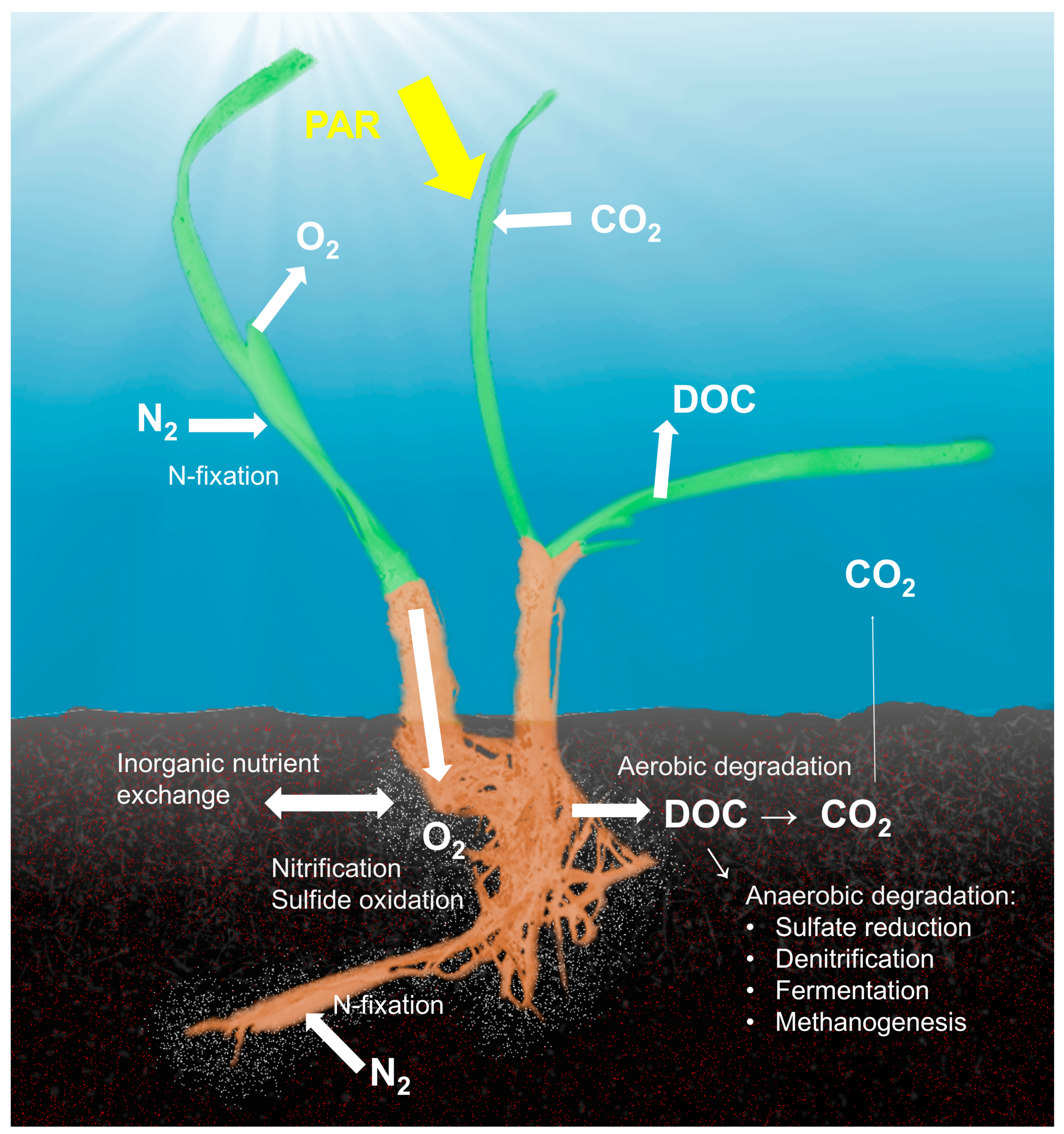
Seagrass holobiont

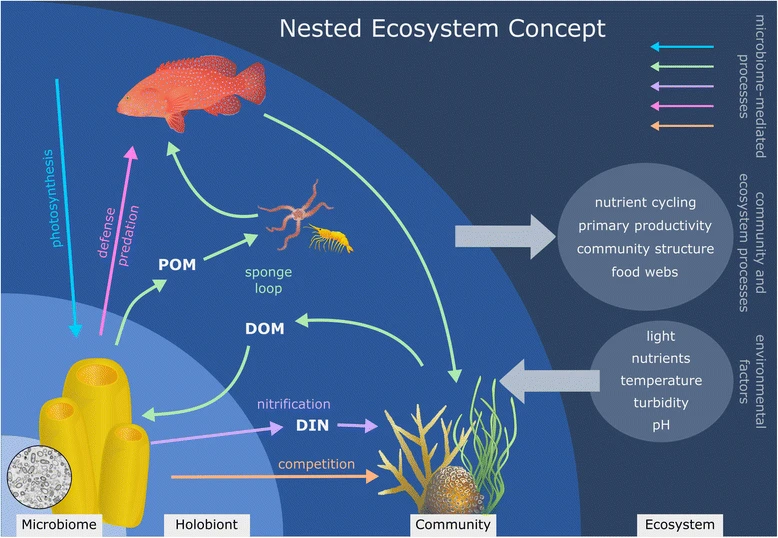
Sponge holobiont

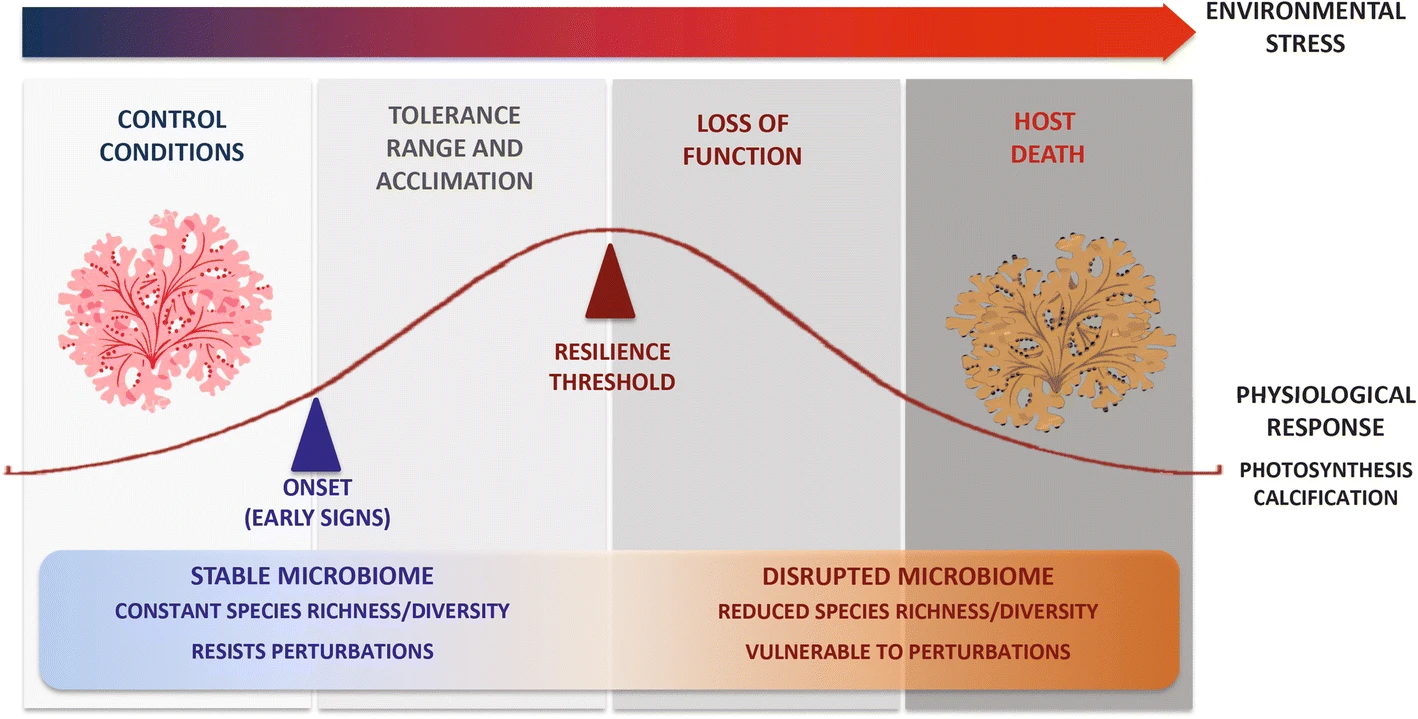
Climate change and the rhodolith holobiont

== Further references ==
- Stal, L. J. and Cretoiu, M. S. (Eds.) (2016) The marine microbiome: an untapped source of biodiversity and biotechnological potential Springer. ISBN 9783319330006.
- Marine Microbiome and Biogeochemical Cycles in Marine Productive Areas. Frontiers Media S.A. 2020. ISBN 978-2-88963-276-3. OCLC 1291256407.
