= Cyartonema elegans =

Scientific classification
- Domain: Eukaryota
- Kingdom: Animalia
- Phylum: Nematoda
- Class: Chromadorea
- Order: Desmoscolecida
- Family: Cyartonematidae
- Genus: Cyartonema
- Species: C. elegans

Binomial name
- Cyartonema elegans Jayasree & Warwick, 1977

Species of roundworm

Cyartonema elegans is a species of free-living marine nematode in the genus Cyartonema found in Scotland.
