= Astomonema =

Scientific classification
- Domain: Eukaryota
- Kingdom: Animalia
- Phylum: Nematoda
- Class: Chromadorea
- Order: Monhysterida
- Family: Siphonolaimidae
- Subfamily: Astomonematinae
- Genus: Astomonema; Ott, Rieger, Rieger & Enderes, 1982

Species
- See text

Genus of roundworms

Astomonema is a genus of nematode worms in the family Siphonolaimidae. They lack a mouth or conventional digestive tract, but contain symbiotic sulfur-oxidizing bacteria that serve as their primary food source. They live in the marine interstitial habitat.

== Systematics ==
The genus was first described in 1982 from specimens collected at the coast of North Carolina. It belongs to the subfamily Astomonematinae within the family Siphonolaimidae, along with another genus Parastomonema; both these genera have reduced digestive systems and paired ovaries. Five species of Astomonema have been described.

- Astomonema jenneri Ott, Rieger, Rieger & Enderes, 1982
- Astomonema obscura (Boucher & Helléouët, 1977)
- Astomonema otti Vidakovic & Boucher, 1987
- Astomonema southwardorum Austen, Warwick & Ryan, 1993
- Astomonema brevicauda (Vitiello, 1971) Vidakovik & Boucher, 1987 (taxon inquirendum)

== Description ==
Worms of the type species Astomonema jenneri are long and slender, with a maximum body diameter of 25.5 to 30 μm, but body length between 4.6 and 16.3 mm. Astomonema and the related genus Parastomonema are distinguished from other members of the family Siphonolaimidae by their lack of a mouth, highly reduced pharynx, and modified midgut that contains prokaryotic symbionts. Features that they share with other Siphonolaimidae include the overall body shape (long, slender and cylindrical, only slightly tapered at the front), conspicuous amphidial glands, large nerve ring, lack of setae on the body, and ability to heal wounds readily when the body is injured or broken.

== Symbiosis with bacteria ==
Although nematodes in this genus lack a conventional gut, they have a chain of long, thin, and slender cells that run down the center of the body. These cells are interpreted as a rudimentary or highly-modified gut wall, and they have few organelles besides nuclei and mitochondria. This central layer of cells contains symbiotic bacteria, which are intracellular in A. jenneri but extracellular in other species e.g. A. southwardorum. The bacteria have an elliptical shape in cross-section, and can have different sizes in different host species. For example, in A. jenneri they are 1 x 3 μm whereas in A. southwardorum they are up to 4 x 6 μm. In A. jenneri, a second type of bacteria that is smaller (0.1 - 0.5 μm) and rod-shaped has been observed, but is much less common than the larger cells.

The bacteria belong to the family Chromatiaceae in the Gammaproteobacteria, and are close relatives of similar symbionts from oligochaete worms Olavius algarvensis, Inanidrilus leukodermatus, and symbionts from the nematode subfamily Stilbonematinae (Desmodoridae). Their relatives are sulfur-oxidizing chemoautotrophs that use energy from oxidation of sulfur compounds in the environment (e.g. sulfide) to fuel the production of biomass by carbon fixation. The symbionts of Astomonema are likely to also be sulfur-oxidizers because they have at least one of the key genes, aprA, encoding the alpha subunit of adenylyl-sulfate reductase, involved in the metabolic pathway of sulfur oxidation. This is an example of chemosynthetic symbiosis, where symbiotic prokaryotes use chemical energy to produce biomass and feed their host animals, which often have highly-reduced digestive systems.

== See also ==
- Stilbonematinae – subfamily of nematodes (family Desmodoridae) that also have sulfur-oxidizing symbiotic bacteria
