= Siphonolaimidae =

Scientific classification
- Domain: Eukaryota
- Kingdom: Animalia
- Phylum: Nematoda
- Class: Chromadorea
- Order: Monhysterida
- Family: Siphonolaimidae

Family of nematodes

Siphonolaimidae is a family of nematodes belonging to the order Monhysterida.

Genera:

- Astomonema Ott, Rieger, Rieger & Enderes, 1982
- Cyartonema
- Parastomonema Kito, 1989
- Paraterschellingia
- Siphonolaimus de Man, 1893
- Solenolaimus Cobb, 1893
- Southernia
