= Stilbonematinae =

Scientific classification
- Domain: Eukaryota
- Kingdom: Animalia
- Phylum: Nematoda
- Class: Chromadorea
- Order: Desmodorida
- Family: Desmodoridae
- Subfamily: Stilbonematinae; Chitwood, 1936

Genera
- (See article text)

Subfamily of roundworms

Stilbonematinae is a subfamily of the nematode worm family Desmodoridae that is notable for its symbiosis with sulfur-oxidizing bacteria.

== Systematics ==
Stilbonematinae Chitwood, 1936 belongs to the family Desmodoridae in the order Desmodorida. Nine genera have been described.

- Adelphos Ott, 1997
- Catanema Cobb, 1920
- Centonema Leduc, 2013
- Eubostrichus Greeff, 1869
- Laxus Cobb, 1894
- Leptonemella Cobb, 1920
- Parabostrichus Tchesunov et al. 2012
- Robbea Gerlach, 1956
- Squanema Gerlach, 1963
- Stilbonema Cobb, 1920

== Description ==
Stilbonematines can be up to 10 mm long, with a club-like head. The worms are completely covered in a coat of ectosymbiotic sulfur-oxidizing bacteria except for the anterior region. The presence of the bacteria, which often contain intracellular inclusions of elemental sulfur, gives the worms a bright white appearance under incident light. They have small mouths and buccal cavities, and short pharynges. Many species have multicellular sensory-glandular organs in longitudinal rows along the length of the body, which secrete mucus that the bacterial symbionts are embedded in.

Stilbonematines are found in the meiofaunal habitat in marine environments. Another group of meiofaunal nematodes with sulfur-oxidizing symbionts is the genus Astomonema, although in Astomonema the bacteria are endo- rather than ectosymbionts.

== Symbiosis with sulfur-oxidizing bacteria ==
The bacterial symbionts of stilbonematines are of different shapes and sizes, ranging from small coccoid cells to elongate crescent-like cells, but each host species has only a single morphological type associated with it. The bacterial symbionts of stilbonematines are closely related to the sulfur-oxidizing symbionts of gutless phallodriline oligochaete worms: these bacteria were all descended from a single ancestor, and each host species has its own specific bacterial species.

The bacterial symbionts are chemosynthetic, gaining energy by oxidizing sulfide from the environment, and producing biomass by fixing carbon dioxide through the Calvin-Benson-Bassham cycle. The bacteria benefit from the symbiosis because the host animal can migrate between sulfide- and oxygen-rich regions of the sediment habitat, and the bacteria require both these chemical substances to produce energy. The hosts are believed to consume the bacteria as a food source, based on evidence from their stable carbon isotope ratios.

The specificity of the bacterial symbionts to their respective host species is controlled by a lectin called Mermaid that is produced by the worms. Mermaid occurs in different isoforms, which have differing affinities for the sugar compositions of the lipopolysaccharide coat in different bacterial species.

== See also ==
- Olavius algarvensis - A species of gutless phallodriline oligochaete worms whose sulfur-oxidizing bacterial symbionts are related to those of the stilbonematine nematodes.
- Astomonema - A genus of nematodes (from a different family) that also has symbiotic sulfur-oxidizing bacteria.
