= Laxus =

Scientific classification
- Kingdom: Animalia
- Phylum: Nematoda
- Class: Chromadorea
- Order: Desmodorida
- Family: Desmodoridae
- Subfamily: Stilbonematinae
- Genus: Laxus; Cobb, 1894

Genus of roundworms

Laxus is a genus of nematode worms from the subfamily Stilbonematinae of the family Desmodoridae. Like other members of this subfamily, they are covered by a layer of symbiotic sulfur-oxidizing bacteria, which in Laxus are coccoid in shape. They are distinguished from other stilbonematine genera by the finely-annulated somatic cuticle, thickened cephalic cuticle, small and coiled amphidial fovea, and lack of male structures. There are at least five species in the genus. Some species have a dense bacterial coat.
