= Olavius pravus =

Scientific classification
- Kingdom: Animalia
- Phylum: Annelida
- Clade: Pleistoannelida
- Clade: Sedentaria
- Class: Clitellata
- Order: Tubificida
- Family: Naididae
- Genus: Olavius
- Species: O. pravus

Binomial name
- Olavius pravus Erséus, 1990

Species of annelid

Olavius pravus is a species of clitellate oligochaete worm, first found in Belize, on the Caribbean side of Central America.
