= Desmoscolecidae =

Scientific classification
- Kingdom: Animalia
- Phylum: Nematoda
- Class: Chromadorea
- Order: Desmoscolecida
- Suborder: Desmoscolecina
- Superfamily: Desmoscolecoidea
- Family: Desmoscolecidae; Shipley, 1896

Synonyms
- Calligyridae

Family of nematodes

Desmoscolecidae is a family of nematodes belonging to the order Desmoscolecida.

== Genera ==
Genera:

- Antarcticonema Timm, 1978
- Calligyrus Lorenzen, 1969
- Demanema Timm, 1970
