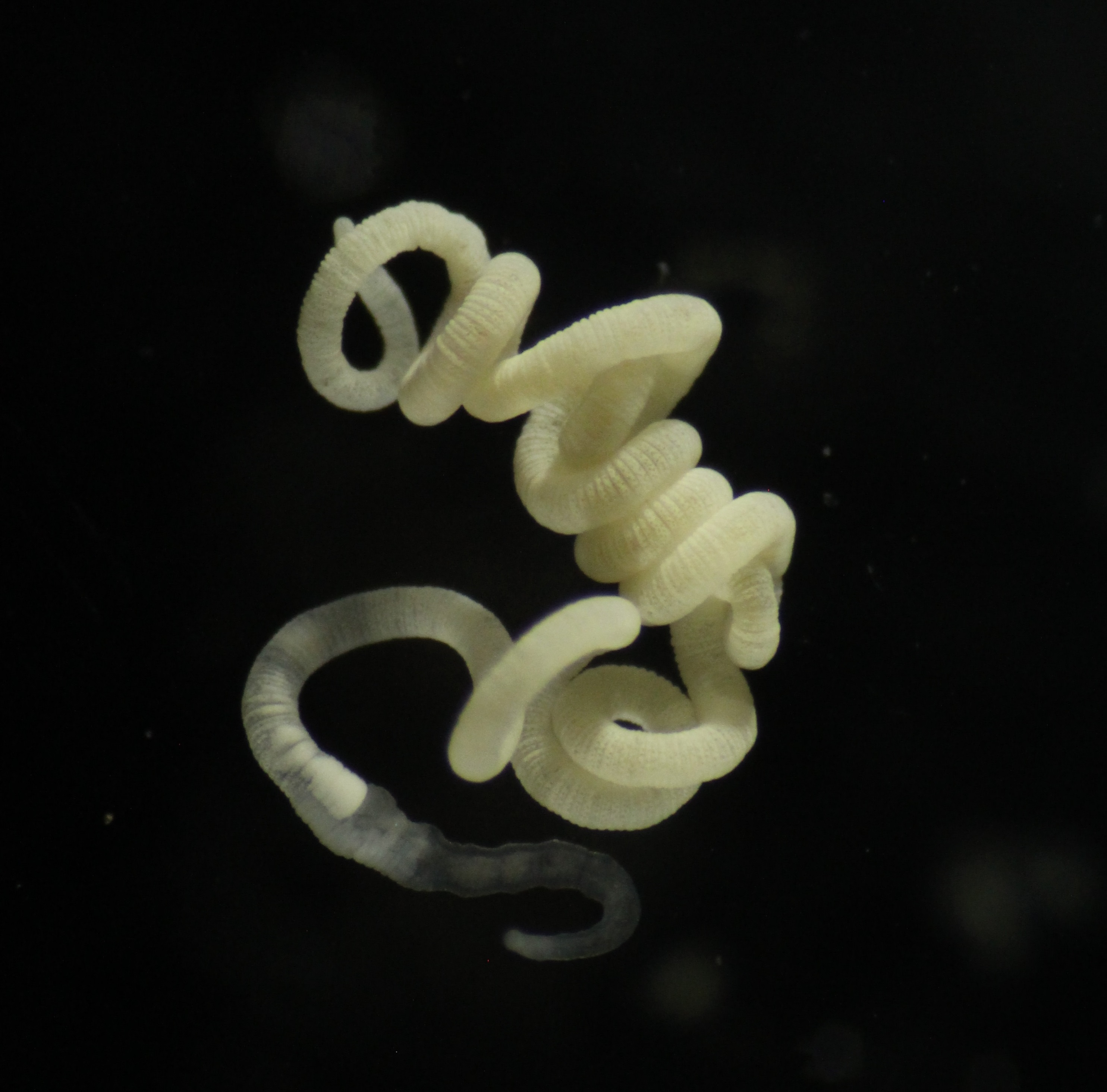
- Olavius algarvensis

Scientific classification
- Kingdom: Animalia
- Phylum: Annelida
- Clade: Pleistoannelida
- Clade: Sedentaria
- Class: Clitellata
- Order: Tubificida
- Family: Naididae
- Subfamily: Phallodrilinae
- Genus: Olavius; Erséus, 1984

Type species
- Olavius longissimus (Giere, 1979)

Species
- See text

= Olavius =

Genus of annelid

Olavius is a genus of oligochaete worms, first described by Christer Erséus in 1984.

Members of the genus are found in the waters of Queensland and Western Australia, off the coasts of Fiji and the Solomon Islands at depths of 200 m.

== Subdivisions ==
The following subdivisions are currently accepted within the genus Olavius.

=== Subgenus Olavius (Coralliodriloides) ===
- Olavius (Coralliodriloides) avisceralis (Erséus, 1981)
- Olavius (Coralliodriloides) fredi Erséus, 1997
- Olavius (Coralliodriloides) hanssoni Erséus, 1984
- Olavius (Coralliodriloides) loisae Erséus, 1984
- Olavius (Coralliodriloides) mokapuensis Erséus & Davis, 1989
- Olavius (Coralliodriloides) rottnestensis Erséus, 1993
- Olavius (Coralliodriloides) strigosus Erséus & Davis, 1989

=== Subgenus Olavius (Olavius) ===
- Olavius (Olavius) alius Erséus, 1984
- Olavius (Olavius) longissimus (Giere, 1979)
- Olavius (Olavius) pravus Erséus, 1990
- Olavius (Olavius) tantulus Erséus, 1984

=== Other species ===
- Olavius abrolhosensis Erséus, 1997
- Olavius albidoides Erséus, 1997
- Olavius albidus (Jamieson, 1977)
- Olavius algarvensis Giere, Erséus & Stuhlmacher, 1998
- Olavius amplectens Erséus & Bergfeldt, 2007
- Olavius avitus Erséus, 2003
- Olavius bullatus Finogenova, 1986
- Olavius capillus Erséus, 1997
- Olavius caudatus (Erséus, 1979)
- Olavius clavatus (Erséus, 1981)
- Olavius comorensis (Erséus, 1981)
- Olavius cornuatus Davis, 1984
- Olavius crassitunicatus Finogenova, 1986
- Olavius curtus Erséus, 2003
- Olavius fidelis Erséus & Bergfeldt, 2007
- Olavius filithecatus (Erséus, 1981)
- Olavius finitimus Erséus, 1990
- Olavius furinus Erséus, 2003
- Olavius fusus Erséus, 1993
- Olavius geniculatus (Erséus, 1981)
- Olavius gierei Erséus, 1997
- Olavius hamulatus Erséus, 1997
- Olavius ilvae Giere & Erséus, 2002
- Olavius imperfectus Erséus, 1984
- Olavius isomerus Erséus & Bergfeldt, 2007
- Olavius latus Erséus, 1986
- Olavius lifouensis Erséus & Bergfeldt, 2007
- Olavius macer Erséus, 1984
- Olavius manifae Erséus, 1985
- Olavius montebelloensis Erséus, 1997
- Olavius muris Erséus, 2003
- Olavius nicolae Erséus & Giere, 1995
- Olavius nivalis Erséus & Bergfeldt, 2007
- Olavius paraloisae Erséus & Bergfeldt, 2007
- Olavius parapellucidus Erséus & Davis, 1989
- Olavius patriciae Erséus, 1993
- Olavius pellucidus Erséus, 1984
- Olavius planus (Erséus, 1979)
- Olavius prodigus Erséus, 1993
- Olavius productus Erséus, 1997
- Olavius propinquus Erséus, 1984
- Olavius rallus Erséus, 1991
- Olavius separatus Erséus, 1993
- Olavius soror Erséus, 2003
- Olavius tannerensis Erséus, 1991
- Olavius tenuissimus (Erséus, 1979)
- Olavius ullae Erséus, 2003
- Olavius ulrikae Erséus, 2008
- Olavius vacuus Erséus, 1990
- Olavius valens Erséus, 1997
- Olavius verpa Erséus, 1985
