= Bathydrilus vetustus =

Scientific classification
- Domain: Eukaryota
- Kingdom: Animalia
- Phylum: Annelida
- Clade: Pleistoannelida
- Clade: Sedentaria
- Class: Clitellata
- Order: Tubificida
- Family: Naididae
- Genus: Bathydrilus
- Species: B. vetustus

Binomial name
- Bathydrilus vetustus Erséus, 1990

Species of annelid

Bathydrilus vetustus is a species of clitellate oligochaete worm, first found in Belize, on the Caribbean side of Central America.
