= Bathydrilus =

Scientific classification
- Domain: Eukaryota
- Kingdom: Animalia
- Phylum: Annelida
- Clade: Pleistoannelida
- Clade: Sedentaria
- Class: Clitellata
- Order: Tubificida
- Family: Naididae
- Subfamily: Phallodrilinae
- Genus: Bathydrilus; Cook, 1970

Species
- See text

Genus of annelid

Bathydrilus is a genus of clitellate oligochaete worms.

== Species ==
The following species are accepted in the genus Bathydrilus:

- Bathydrilus adriaticus (Hrabĕ, 1971)
- Bathydrilus ampliductus Erséus, 1997
- Bathydrilus argentinae Erséus, 1983
- Bathydrilus asymmetricus Cook, 1970
- Bathydrilus atlanticus Erséus, 1979
- Bathydrilus connexus Erséus, 1988
- Bathydrilus desbruyeresi Erséus, 1983
- Bathydrilus difficilis Erséus & Wang, 2005
- Bathydrilus edwardsi Erséus, 1984
- Bathydrilus egenus Erséus, 1990
- Bathydrilus exilis Erséus & Davis, 1989
- Bathydrilus formosus Erséus, 1986
- Bathydrilus fortis Erséus, 1997
- Bathydrilus graciliatriatus Erséus, 1979
- Bathydrilus hadalis Erséus, 1979
- Bathydrilus ingens Erséus, 1986
- Bathydrilus litoreus Baker, 1983
- Bathydrilus longiatriatus Erséus, 1983
- Bathydrilus longus Erséus, 1979
- Bathydrilus macroprostatus Erséus, 1986
- Bathydrilus medius Erséus, 1983
- Bathydrilus meridianus Erséus, 1979
- Bathydrilus munitus Erséus, 1990
- Bathydrilus notabilis Erséus & Milligan, 1988
- Bathydrilus paramunitus Erséus & Wang, 2003
- Bathydrilus parkeri Erséus, 1991
- Bathydrilus rarisetis (Erséus, 1975)
- Bathydrilus rohdei (Jamieson, 1977)
- Bathydrilus rusticus Erséus, 1991
- Bathydrilus sandersi Erséus, 1983
- Bathydrilus superiovasatus Erséus, 1981
- Bathydrilus torosus Baker, 1983
- Bathydrilus vetustus Erséus, 1990
