= Olavius finitimus =

Scientific classification
- Kingdom: Animalia
- Phylum: Annelida
- Clade: Pleistoannelida
- Clade: Sedentaria
- Class: Clitellata
- Order: Tubificida
- Family: Naididae
- Genus: Olavius
- Species: O. finitimus

Binomial name
- Olavius finitimus Erséus, 1990

Species of annelid

Olavius finitimus is a species of oligochaete worm, first found in Belize, on the Caribbean side of Central America.
