= Meyliidae =

Scientific classification
- Domain: Eukaryota
- Kingdom: Animalia
- Phylum: Nematoda
- Class: Chromadorea
- Order: Desmoscolecida
- Suborder: Desmoscolecina
- Superfamily: Desmoscolecoidea
- Family: Meyliidae de Coninck, 1965

Family of roundworms

Meyliidae is a family of nematodes belonging to the order Desmoscolecida.

Genera:

- Boucherius Decraemer & Jensen, 1981
- Erebus Bussau
- Erebussau Bezerra, Pape, Hauquier & Vanreusel, 2021
- Gerlachius Andrássy, 1976
- Meylia Gerlach, 1956
- Noffsingeria Decraemer & Jensen, 1981
