= Phallodrilus =

Scientific classification
- Kingdom: Animalia
- Phylum: Annelida
- Clade: Pleistoannelida
- Clade: Sedentaria
- Class: Clitellata
- Order: Tubificida
- Family: Naididae
- Subfamily: Phallodrilinae
- Genus: Phallodrilus; Pierantoni, 1902

Genus of annelids

Phallodrilus is a genus of invertebrates in the family Naididae. It contains the following species:

- Phallodrilus parthenopaeus
