= Paraterschellingia =

Scientific classification
- Domain: Eukaryota
- Kingdom: Animalia
- Phylum: Nematoda
- Class: Chromadorea
- Order: Desmoscolecida
- Family: Cyartonematidae
- Genus: Paraterschellingia; Kreis, 1935

Genus of roundworms

Paraterschellingia is a genus of nematodes belonging to the family Cyartonematidae.

The species of this genus are found in Antarctica.

Species:

- Paraterschellingia brevicaudata (Kreis, 1924)
- Paraterschellingia fusiformis Gerlach, 1951
- Paraterschellingia fusuformis Gerlach, 1951
