= Cyartonema =

Scientific classification
- Domain: Eukaryota
- Kingdom: Animalia
- Phylum: Nematoda
- Class: Chromadorea
- Order: Desmoscolecida
- Family: Cyartonematidae
- Genus: Cyartonema; Cobb, 1920

Species
- Cyartonema doris Tchesunov, 1989; Cyartonema elegans Jayasree & Warwick, 1977; Cyartonema flexile Cobb, 1920; Cyartonema germanicum Juario, 1972; Cyartonema parvulum Tchesunov, 1989; Cyartonema roervikensis (Allgén, 1946); Cyartonema siphonolaimoides; Cyartonema tenuicauda (Allgén, 1933); Cyartonema zosterae (Allgén, 1929)

Synonyms
- Southernia Allgén, 1929

Genus of roundworms

Cyartonema is a genus of nematodes in the order Monhysterida.
