= Olavius vacuus =

Scientific classification
- Domain: Eukaryota
- Kingdom: Animalia
- Phylum: Annelida
- Clade: Pleistoannelida
- Clade: Sedentaria
- Class: Clitellata
- Order: Tubificida
- Family: Naididae
- Genus: Olavius
- Species: O. vacuus

Binomial name
- Olavius vacuus Erséus, 1990

Species of annelid

Olavius vacuus is a species of oligochaete worm, first found in Belize, on the Caribbean side of Central America.
