= Spiridion (annelid) =

Scientific classification
- Domain: Eukaryota
- Kingdom: Animalia
- Phylum: Annelida
- Clade: Pleistoannelida
- Clade: Sedentaria
- Class: Clitellata
- Order: Tubificida
- Family: Naididae
- Genus: Spiridion; Knöllner, 1935

Genus of annelid worms

Spiridion is a genus of annelids belonging to the family Naididae.

The species of this genus are found in Europe, Russia and Northern America.

Species:

- Spiridion insigne Knöllner, 1935
- Spiridion modricensis (Hrabĕ, 1973)
- Spiridion phreaticola (Juget, 1987)
- Spiridion scrobicularae Lastoćkin, 1937
