= Gianius =

Scientific classification
- Domain: Eukaryota
- Kingdom: Animalia
- Phylum: Annelida
- Clade: Pleistoannelida
- Clade: Sedentaria
- Class: Clitellata
- Order: Tubificida
- Family: Naididae
- Genus: Gianius; Erséus, 1992

Genus of annelid worms

Gianius is a genus of annelids belonging to the family Naididae.

The species of this genus are found in Europe and Northern America.

Species:

- Gianius anatolicus Arslan, Timm & Erséus, 2007
- Gianius aquaedulcis (Hrabě, 1960)
- Gianius cavealis Juget & Des Châtelliers, 2001
- Gianius cristolatus (Erséus, 1983)
- Gianius crypticus (Rodriguez & Giani, 1989)
- Gianius densespectinis (Erséus, 1987)
- Gianius eximius Erséus, 1997
- Gianius labouichensis (Rodriguez & Giani, 1989)
- Gianius monnioti (Erséus, 1987)
- Gianius navarroi Rodriguez & Achurra, 2010
- Gianius riparius (Giani & Martinez-Ansemil, 1981)
