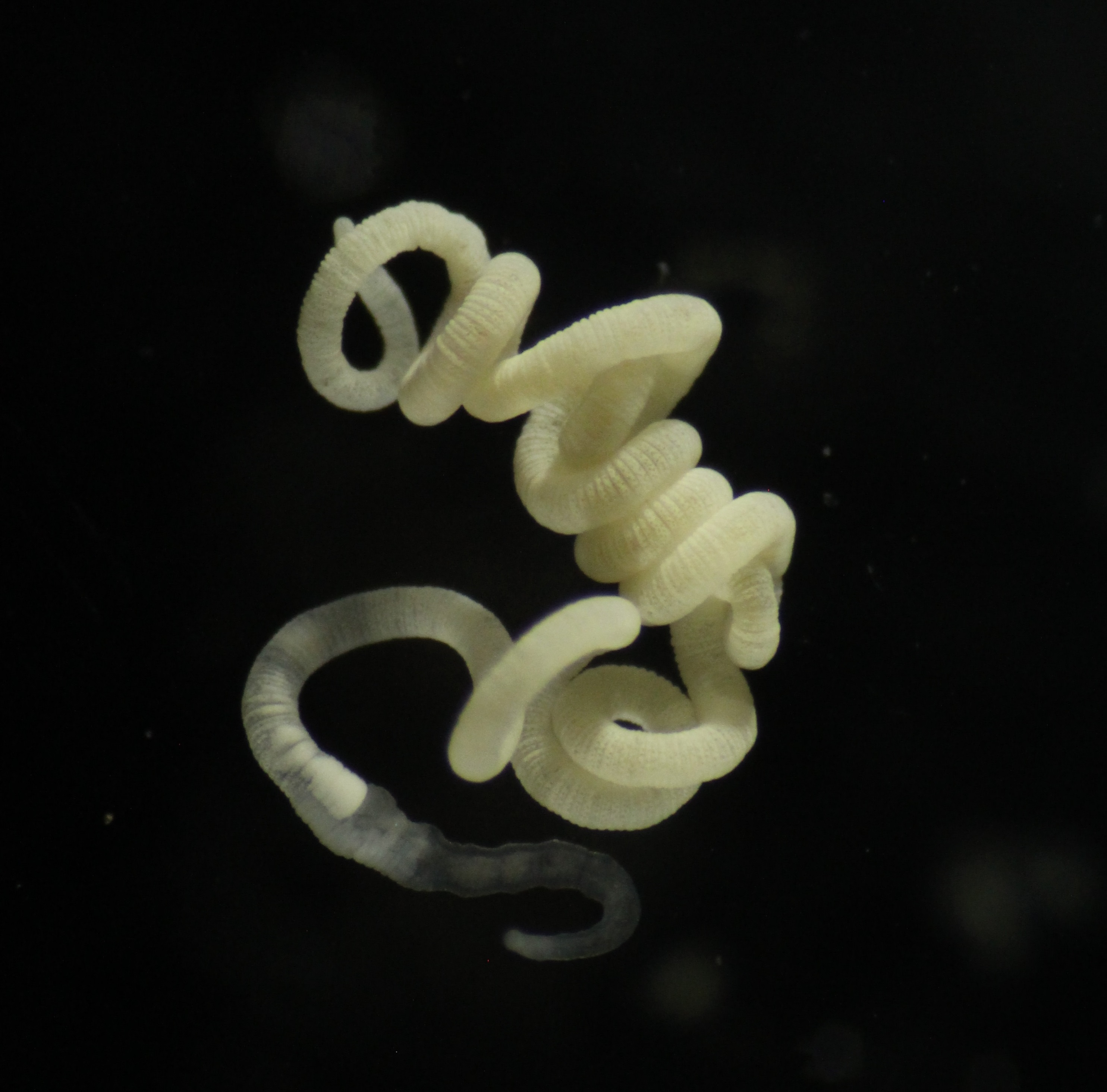

Scientific classification
- Kingdom: Animalia
- Phylum: Annelida
- Clade: Pleistoannelida
- Clade: Sedentaria
- Class: Clitellata
- Order: Tubificida
- Family: Naididae
- Genus: Olavius
- Species: O. algarvensis

Binomial name
- Olavius algarvensis Giere, Erséus & Stuhlmacher, 1998

= Olavius algarvensis =

Species of annelid worm

Olavius algarvensis is a species of gutless oligochaete worm in the family Tubificidae which depends on symbiotic bacteria for its nutrition.

== Habitats and research ==
Olavius algarvensis lives in coastal sediments in the Mediterranean. It was first described from the Algarve Coast of Portugal, but has also been found elsewhere, e.g. off the Italian island Elba, where it co-occurs with another species, O. ilvae. It was the first species of Olavius described from the East Atlantic coast; previously the genus was only known from the Caribbean.

== Description ==
Olavius algarvensis is 12–25 mm long, about 0.25 mm wide, and has between 100 and 150 segments. Like all other species in the genus Olavius, this species has no digestive tract. Instead, the body cavity contains the ventral nerve cord (inside a muscular sheath) and two blood vessels which are surrounded by a "fluffy" layer of chloragocytic cells. They are distinguished from other species of Olavius by having round, flap-like external male papillae that cover the two ventral invaginations of the body wall which contain the male pores (in segment XI), and having small atria that are perpendicular rather than parallel to the body axis. The symbiotic bacteria are located between the cuticle and epidermis, and also in vacuoles within epidermal cells, which often show signs of lysis. The bacteria are absent from the anterior part of the worm and the pygidium, but are found from segment VII or VIII onwards. While cholesterol partially comprises the sterols in their cell membranes, sitosterol, generally a plant sterol, predominates.

== Symbiosis with bacteria ==
Oligochaete worms without any mouth, gut, or nephridial excretory system were first discovered in the 1970s-1980s near Bermuda. They were later found to contain symbiotic chemosynthetic bacteria which serve as their primary food source. O. algarvensis is the species where this symbiosis has been studied in the most detail.

There are five different species of bacterial symbionts in O. algarvensis, which are located under the cuticle of the worm: two sulfide-oxidizing Gammaproteobacteria, two sulfate-reducing Deltaproteobacteria, and one spirochaete. The sulfide-oxidizers gain energy from oxidation of hydrogen sulfide, and fix carbon dioxide via the Calvin cycle. The sulfate-reducers are anaerobes that can reduce sulfate into sulfide, which is consumed by the sulfide-oxidizers. The metabolism of the spirochaete is unknown. Other species of Olavius are also known to have similar symbioses with both sulfide-oxidizing and sulfate-reducing bacteria in the same worm.

The primary sulfur-oxidizing symbiont, known as "Gamma1", is closely related to the primary symbionts of other species of gutless oligochaetes in the Phallodrilinae, and also to the symbionts of nematodes in the subfamily Stilbonematinae.

In addition to hydrogen sulfide, the symbiotic bacteria also allow the worm to use hydrogen and carbon monoxide as energy sources, and to metabolise organic compounds like malate and acetate. These abilities were first discovered by sequencing the genomes and proteomes of the bacteria.

The symbiotic bacteria which live with O. algarvensis have other unique properties. One of the Deltaproteobacteria symbionts, called "Delta-1", is able to produce numerous seleno- and pyrroproteins, which contain the amino acids selenocysteine and pyrrolysine that are sometimes called the 21st and 22nd proteinogenic amino acids. This bacterium has the largest known proteome that has seleno- and pyrroproteins. The symbionts also express the most transposases of any known bacteria.
