= Abyssidrilus =

Scientific classification
- Domain: Eukaryota
- Kingdom: Animalia
- Phylum: Annelida
- Clade: Pleistoannelida
- Clade: Sedentaria
- Class: Clitellata
- Order: Tubificida
- Family: Naididae
- Genus: Abyssidrilus; Erséus, 1992

Genus of annelid worms

Abyssidrilus is a genus of annelids belonging to the family Naididae.

The genus has almost cosmopolitan distribution.

Species:

- Abyssidrilus altoides Erséus, 1992
- Abyssidrilus altus (Erséus, 1980)
- Abyssidrilus hessleri (Erséus, 1989)
- Abyssidrilus opulentus Erséus, 1992
- Abyssidrilus potens Erséus, 1992
- Abyssidrilus profundus (Cook, 1970)
- Abyssidrilus remus (Erséus, 1979)
- Abyssidrilus segonzaci (Erséus, 1986)
- Abyssidrilus stilus (Erséus, 1986)
