= Cyartonematidae =

Scientific classification
- Domain: Eukaryota
- Kingdom: Animalia
- Phylum: Nematoda
- Class: Chromadorea
- Order: Desmoscolecida
- Suborder: Desmoscolecina
- Superfamily: Desmoscolecoidea
- Family: Cyartonematidae; Tchesunov, 1989

Family of roundworms

Cyartonematidae is a family of nematodes belonging to the order Desmoscolecida.

Genera:

- Cyartonema Cobb, 1920
- Cyartonemoides Thanh & Gagarin, 2011
- Paraterschellingia Kreis, 1935
