= Aktedrilus =

Scientific classification
- Kingdom: Animalia
- Phylum: Annelida
- Clade: Pleistoannelida
- Clade: Sedentaria
- Class: Clitellata
- Order: Tubificida
- Family: Naididae
- Genus: Aktedrilus; Knöllner, 1935

Genus of annelid worms

Aktedrilus is a genus of annelids belonging to the family Naididae.

The genus has cosmopolitan distribution.

Species:

- Aktedrilus arcticus (Erséus, 1978)
- Aktedrilus argatxae Giani & Rodriguez, 1988
- Aktedrilus brevis Erséus, 1980
