= Thalassodrilus =

Scientific classification
- Kingdom: Animalia
- Phylum: Annelida
- Clade: Pleistoannelida
- Clade: Sedentaria
- Class: Clitellata
- Order: Tubificida
- Family: Naididae
- Genus: Thalassodrilus; Brinkhurst, 1963

Genus of annelid worms

Thalassodrilus is a genus of annelids belonging to the family Naididae.

The species of this genus are found in Europe and Northern America.

Species:

- Thalassodrilus bicki Erséus, 1994
- Thalassodrilus bruneti Erséus, 1990
