= Parastomonema =

Scientific classification
- Kingdom: Animalia
- Phylum: Nematoda
- Class: Chromadorea
- Order: Monhysterida
- Family: Siphonolaimidae
- Genus: Parastomonema; Kito, 1989

Genus of roundworms

Parastomonema is a genus of nematodes belonging to the family Siphonolaimidae.

The species of this genus are found in Portugal.

Species:

- Parastomonema fijiensi Kito, 1989
- Parastomonema papillosum Kito & Aryuthaka, 2006
