= Desmodoridae =

Scientific classification
- Kingdom: Animalia
- Phylum: Nematoda
- Class: Chromadorea
- Order: Desmodorida
- Superfamily: Desmodoroidea
- Family: Desmodoridae; Filipjev, 1922

Type species
- Desmodora de Man, 1889

Synonyms
- Molgolaimidae; Spirinidae

Family of nematodes

Desmodoridae is a family of nematodes belonging to the order Desmodorida.

== Genera ==
Genera:

- Acanthopharyngoides Chitwood, 1936
- Acanthopharynx Marion, 1870
- Adelphos Ott, 1997
- Bolbenoma _{Cobb, 1920}
- Cheilopseudonchus _{Murphy, 1964}
- Cornurella _{Da Silva, Da Silva, Esteves & Decraemer, 2017}
- Croconema _{Cobb, 1920}
- Desmodora _{de Man, 1889}
