= Desmoscolecoidea =

Scientific classification
- Domain: Eukaryota
- Kingdom: Animalia
- Phylum: Nematoda
- Class: Chromadorea
- Subclass: Chromadoria
- Order: Desmoscolecida; Filipjev, 1929
- Suborder: Desmoscolecina; Filipjev, 1934
- Superfamily: Desmoscolecoidea; Shipley, 1896

Families
- Cyartonematidae Tchesunov, 1990; Desmoscolecidae Shipley, 1896; †Eophasmidae Poinar, 2011; Meyliidae de Coninck, 1965

Order of roundworms

Desmoscolecida is an order of marine nematodes. It has just one suborder, Desmoscolecina, which itself has one superfamily, Desmoscolecoidea. In a worm of this order, the body tapers towards each end and is marked by a number of well-defined ridges. Their number varies in the different species. The head bears four movable setae, and some of the ridges bear a pair either dorsally or ventrally. Two pigment spots between the fourth and fifth ridges are regarded as eyes. The Desmoscolecida move by looping their bodies like geometrid caterpillars or leeches, as well as by creeping on their setae. The mouth is terminal, and leads into a muscular oesophagus which opens into a straight intestine terminating in an anus, which is said to be dorsal in position. The sexes are distinct. The testis is single, and its duct opens into the intestine and is provided with two chitinous spicules. The ovary is also single, opening independently and anterior to the anus. The nervous system is as yet unknown.

Genera include Desmoscolex, Greeffiella, and Tricoma.
