= List of Zetsuai albums =

This is a list of albums associated with the manga and anime series Zetsuai 1989, its dojinshi prequel Dokusen Yoku and its sequel Bronze: Zetsuai Since 1989. The albums were released between 1988 and 1996.

== Calekka ==
Calekka

Soundtrack album by Shinichi Ishihara, Suzuki Hiroaki, Tsubakura Yuiko
- Released: November 6, 1988
- Recorded: (Japan)
- Genre: anime soundtrack
- Length: 38 min
- Label: Toshiba-EMI

Calekka Original Album (彼烈火 オリジナルアルバム), sometimes called Karekka, is a music album, released on November 6, 1988 and dedicate to yaoi doujinshi series Dokusen Yoku (独占欲). Dokusen Yoku or Desire to Monopolize were published under the CLUB DOLL circle and it was one of the longest series by Minami Ozaki, the creator of Zetsuai 1989. The yaoi line is developed between Kojiro Hyuga and Ken Wakashimazu, football players from Captain Tsubasa anime and manga.

The album mostly consists of songs performed by Japanese singers Suzuki Hiroaki, Tsubakura Yuiko and Shinichi Ishihara. It also contains one Drama CD track and two instrumental tracks.

=== List of tracks ===
1. Severe Fire (彼烈火, Calekka) – 03:36
  - by Shinichi Ishihara
2. Pensive Autumn (憂秋, Yūshū) – 03:37
3. Don't Call it Love (愛と呼ばせない, Ai to Yobasenai) – 05:06
  - by Suzuki Hiroaki
4. So in Love (いとおしくて, Itōshikute) – 02:54
  - Drama CD
5. ROMANTIC DANCE – 04:09
  - by Tsubakura Yuiko
6. The Secret in the Doll (秘密にDOLL, Himitsu ni DOLL) – 04:52
  - by Shinichi Ishihara
7. I Won't Let You Say Goodbye (さよならなんかいわせない, Sayonara nanka Iwasenai) – 04:15
  - by Shinichi Ishihara
8. Cornered (追いつめられて, Ōtsumerarete) – 02:51
  - by Suzuki Hiroaki
9. Burning Heat (灼熱, Shakunetsu) – 03:32
  - by Shinichi Ishihara
10. Osmotic Pressure (浸透圧, Shintōatsu) – 03:55

== Zetsuai 1989 ==
Zetsuai 1989

Soundtrack album by Ishihara Shinichi
- Released: July 25, 1990
- Recorded: (Japan)
- Genre: Anime soundtrack
- Label: Toshiba EMI

Zetsuai 1989 (絶愛-1989-) – music album, released in Japan on July 25, 1990. This album is based on manga and do not include anime soundtrack. Songs are performed by Ishihara Shinichi.

1. Zetsuai 1989 (絶愛~1989) – 04:57
2. SHAKE IT SHAKE (シェイク イット シェイク) – 04:08
3. Prayer (祈り, Inori) – 04:23
4. Beast (野獣よ, Yajū you) – 04:51
5. Chain (鎖, Kusari) – 03:18
6. What should I do (どうすればいい, Dō sureba ī) – 04:34
7. Again and again (何度も何度も, Nandomo nandomo) – 03:46
8. Bonds (きずな, Kizuna) – 05:30
9. Life (命, Inochi) – 03:43
10. To the One I May Not be Able to Reach Anymore (もう届かないかもしれない人へ, Mō todokanai kamoshirenai hito e) – 04:47

== Zetsuai 1989 version 2 ==
Shakunekka Zetsuai -1989- Version2 (灼熱夏 絶愛 -1989-Version2) – second version, released on September 9, 1992, after the appearance of the first Zetsuai OVA. This time the singer is Shō Hayami, Kouji Nanjo's voice actor.

1. Zetsuai MEGAMIX – 04:23
2. Omen (予兆, Yochō) – 01:02
3. The scarlet scar (真紅の傷跡) – 04:24
4. Change encounter (邂逅, Kaikō) – 01:20
5. Shakunekka (灼熱夏) – 01:30
6. What should I do (どうすればいい, Dō sureba ī) – 04:34
7. D – 02:01
8. The birth of darkness (深黒の誕生, Fukai kuro no tanjō) – 04:24
9. The fragments of the sun (太陽の破片, Taiyō no hahen) – 03:27
10. Blood (血, Chi) – 03:39
11. Bad blood – 03:58
12. Sweet slaughter – 04:55
13. Jesus Christ Love For You – 03:43

"Bad Blood", performed by Hayami Show, was also released as single album on October 14, 1992. It consists of four tracks:

1. BAD BLOOD – 03:58
2. SWEET SLAUGHTER – 04:26
3. BAD BLOOD -karaoke version- – 03:58
4. SWEET SLAUGHTER -karaoke version- – 04:26

== Zetsuai DramaMix 1993 ==
Zetsuai DramaMix 1993 – music album and Drama CD, based on five Zetsuai 1989 manga volumes. Released March 10, 1993.

CD-1
#	Title	Length
1	DRAMA I	26:44
2	The Scarlet Scar (真紅の傷跡, Māka no Kizuato)	04:22
3	DRAMA II	09:03
4	Zetsuai 1989 (絶愛-1989-)	02:06
5	DRAMA III	10:00
6	BAD BLOOD	04:08
CD-2
#	Title	Length
1	ZETSUAI MEGAMIX ~short style~	04:21
2	DRAMA IV	24:36
3	Dō sureba ī (English: What should I do)	04:32
4	DRAMA V	23:00
5	Jesus Christ Love for You	04:56

== The Best of Minami Ozaki ==
The Best of Minami Ozaki - unofficial compilation album featuring songs from Dokusen Yoku (独占欲), Zetsuai 1989 and its sequel Bronze: Zetsuai Since 1989 (ブロンズ ゼツアイ シンス1989). Songs performed by Hayami Sho, Suzuki Hiroaki, Tsubakura Yuiko and Shinichi Ishihara.

Released by Son May Records (SM Records Ltd.) - a Taiwanese company producing bootlegs of Japanese CD's (Anime/Game Soundtracks) from 1990 to 2005.

1. Katsuai ~Cathexis Style~ (渇愛~Cathexis Style~) – 04:34
2. Jesus Christ Love For You – 05:37
3. Zetsuai -1989- (絶愛~1989) – 04:57
4. SHAKE IT SHAKE (シェイク イット シェイク) – 4:08
5. Beast (野獣よ, Yajū yō) – 04:51
6. Lock – 03:18
7. What should I do (どうすればいい, Dō sureba ī) – 04:34
8. Again and again (何度も何度も, Nandomo nandomo) – 03:46
9. Bonds (きずな, Kizuna) – 03:46
10. To the One I May Not be Able to Reach Anymore (もう届かないかもしれない人へ, Mō todokanai kamoshirenai hito e) – 04:47
11. Severe Fire (彼烈火, Calekka) – 03:36
12. Don't Call it Love (愛と呼ばせない, Ai to Yobasenai) – 05:06
13. So i nLove (いとおしくて, Itōshikute) – 02:54
14. ROMANTIC DANCE – 04:06
15. The Secret in the DOLL (秘密にDOLL, Himitsu ni DOLL) – 04:52
16. Burning Heat (灼熱, Shakunetsu) – 03:32

== Bronze - Kouji Nanjo ==
Bronze - Kouji Nanjo

Soundtrack album by Hayami Show
- Released: January 29, 1992
- Recorded: (Japan)
- Genre: Anime soundtrack
- Label: Toshiba EMI

Bronze - Kouji Nanjo (南條晃司/BRONZE) – Kouji Nanjo's songs from manga performed by Shinichi Ishihara. Album was released on January 29, 1992, together with the first Bronze manga volume.

1. Albinoid Junction – 05:32
2. Thorn Bushes in the Dream (夢の棘, Yume no Toge) – 03:10
3. Endless Desire – 03:45
4. Seishiga ~ Still Life ~ (静止画 〜STILL LIFE〜) – 03:28
5. Bridge – 05:11
6. Giant Step – 03:19
7. BRONZE – 03:50
8. Aigenya (哀幻夜) – 06:09
9. Epilogue

CD also includes two bonus tracks: "Zetsuai Megamix 1992 -English Version-" and "Zetsuai Megamix 1992".

== Bronze Original Soundtrack ==
Bronze Original Soundtrack

Soundtrack album by Hayami Show, Inoue Takehide
- Released: December 18, 1996
- Recorded: (Japan)
- Genre: Anime soundtrack
- Label: Victor Entertainment

BRONZE zetsuai since 1989 original soundtrack (BRONZE zetsuai since 1989 オリジナルサウンドトラック) – original soundtrack for the second OVA – Bronze, released on December 18, 1996, under Victor Entertainment label. The singers are Hayami Show and Inoue Takehide (credited as TAKEHIDE). "Bronze – End", sometimes called "Bronze -Final Chapter-", is the ending theme of Bronze OVA.

1. Overture 1996 (オーヴァーチュア 1996) – 04:12
2. Ruby (ルビー) – 04:09
3. Bronze Martyrdom (BRONZE 殉教, Bronze Junkyou) – 05:42
4. Heaven (ヘヴン) – 05:29
5. Debut (デビュー) – 03:31
6. Ego (エゴ) – 01:48
7. Epitaph (エピタフ) – 00:51
8. Sanctuary (サンクチュアリ) – 02:07
9. Scape goat (スペース·ゴート) – 04:54
10. Wings (ウィングス) – 01:23
11. Liar (ライアー) – 01:20
12. Effusion (エフュージョン) – 01:18
13. Pain (ペイン) – 01:19
14. Broken Cliff (断崖, Dangai) – 05:00
15. Childhood (チャイルドフッド) – 02:18
16. Notoriety (ノトーリアティ) – 00:51
17. Hopelessness (ホープレスネス) – 02:36
18. Eternal Rest (エターナル·レスト) – 03:24
19. Bronze – End (BRONZE最終章, BRONZE Saishuushou) – 06:19

Bronze Martyrdom (BRONZE 殉教, Bronze Junkyou) was released as single album on February 21, 1996, and consists of four tracks:

1. BRONZE 殉教
2. SCAPE GOAT
3. BRONZE 殉教 〜off vocal ver.
4. SCAPE GOAT 〜off vocal ver.

== Bronze Endmax ==
Bronze Endmax

Soundtrack album by Hayami Show
- Released: Sep 22, 1993
- Recorded: (Japan)
- Genre: Anime soundtrack
- Label: Toshiba EMI

The packaging for this mini-CD was made up as though it really had been recorded by Nanjo Koji, but once again Hayami Show was the actual vocal performer. The three songs on it were used for the Cathexis music video OAV, along with Bad Blood and Jesus Christ Love for You from the Zetsuai 1989 Type 2 album.

1. 20XX ZETSU-AI～CRIME OF PASSION～ – 05:58
2. Katsuai (渇愛) – 04:40
3. Moonlight Eternal Mobius (月光～MOBIUSの永遠) – 05:11
