= Yukikaze =

Yukikaze (雪風) is Japanese for "Snow Wind", or, idiomatically, snowstorm or blizzard.

Yukikaze may also refer to:

- Japanese destroyer Yukikaze, a Japanese destroyer that served during World War II
- Yukikaze, an Isokaze-class assault destroyer in the Japanese anime television series Space Battleship Yamato
- Yukikaze (novel) (Sentō Yōsei Yukikaze), a Japanese science fiction novel series by Chōhei Kanbayashi and an

animated series based on it

- The best friend and first assistant to Ayanami, one of the major antagonists in the Japanese manga and anime 07-Ghost
- Yukikaze, a Trainbot from Transformers: The Headmasters who turns into a 200 Series Shinkansen.
