= Zetsuai 1989 =

Yaoi manga

- Cover of the Japanese VHS release of the Zetsuai 1989 OVA

絶愛-1989- (Zetsuai 1989)
- Genre: Yaoi
- Created by: Minami Ozaki
- Manga
- Written by: Minami Ozaki
- Published by: Shueisha
- Magazine: Margaret
- Original run: 1989 – 1991
- Volumes: 5
- Manga

Bronze: Zetsuai Since 1989
- Written by: Minami Ozaki
- Published by: Shueisha
- Magazine: Margaret Comics
- Original run: 1992 – 2006
- Volumes: 14
- Original video animation
- Directed by: Endo Takuji (#1); Itsuro Kawasaki (#2)
- Produced by: Masao Maruyama (#1); Mitsuhisa Ishikawa (#2); Youichi Ishikawa (#2)
- Music by: Kenji Kawai (#1); Kow Otani (#2)
- Studio: Madhouse (#1); Production I.G (#2)
- Released: 29 July 1992 – 4 December 1996
- Runtime: 45 minutes each
- Episodes: 2
- Original video animation

Cathexis
- Directed by: Rintaro
- Produced by: Masao Maruyama
- Studio: Madhouse
- Released: 6 July 1994
- Runtime: 30 minutes
- Light novel

Kaen Danshō
- Written by: Akiyama Rin
- Illustrated by: Minami Ozaki
- Published by: Shueisha
- Original run: 1997 – 1998
- Volumes: 4
- Manga

Tenshi Kōtan
- Written by: Minami Ozaki
- Published by: Shueisha
- Magazine: Chorus
- Original run: 28 January 2011 – present
- Volumes: 1

Zetsuai 1989 (Japanese: 絶愛-1989-; lit. "Absolute Love 1989"; alternately titled in English as Desperate Love and Everlasting Love) is a Japanese manga series written and illustrated by Minami Ozaki. It is a yaoi (male-male romance) series that follows the relationship between a rock musician and a soccer prodigy. Originally serialized in the manga magazine Margaret beginning in 1989, the series has produced a variety of adaptations and spin-offs, including the sequel series Bronze: Zetsuai Since 1989 (ブロンズ ゼツアイ シンス1989), two original video animations (OVAs), a series of soundtrack albums, and several light novels. Zetsuai 1989 has been noted by critics as a major work of the yaoi genre, and was one of the first works in the genre to reach an international audience.

== Synopsis ==
Kōji Nanjō is one of the most successful rock stars in Japan, with his hauntingly beautiful voice and his visual kei style. But beneath all the fame and glamour, he is a damaged and hurt young man who has absolutely no happiness or interest in life.

One night after a string of bar-hopping, Kōji passes out in a heap of trash in the rain. He is found, taken in, and cared for by Takuto Izumi, a soccer prodigy. Despite the fact that Izumi is a complete stranger, he moves Kōji deeply, and Kōji soon develops an intense obsession with Izumi. It is later revealed that the reason Kōji sings is to find the person he fell in love with at first sight six years earlier, whom he remembers for showing extreme ferocity on the soccer field and for a particularly penetrating gaze. Kōji knows the person's name is 'Izumi,' but he thinks the person he saw was a girl, so initially he believes it was Serika Izumi, Takuto's sister. It is only when Takuto looks at him angrily that he realizes Takuto is the 'Izumi' he was looking for. His body goes into shock, and from then on his obsession with Izumi knows no bounds.

As Kōji forces himself more and more into Izumi's life, he exposes Izumi and his loved ones to his dangerous lifestyle and extremely dysfunctional family. When Takuto's little brother asks Kōji if he is gay, Kōji replies, 'No, I am not gay. I am only in love with Takuto. Even if you were twins, I could only love Takuto.' At times, the hurdles the relationship faces become too difficult to bear. In the midst of it, Kōji temporarily loses his voice and is forced to go back to his brother and family.

Due to the manga artist's illness, the manga ended at volume 19 without a proper ending. When she recovered, she drew the dojinshi Ai ni Obore, Ai ni Shisu (愛に溺れ、愛にしす, lit. Drowning in Love, Too much Love; also known as Dekishi (溺死, lit. Death by Drowning)), to give readers a proper 'final meeting' scene.

== Characters ==
Kouji Nanjo (南城市 浩二, Nanjo Kouji) Voiced by: Sho Hayami

Takuto Izumi (泉 拓人, Izumi Takuto)

Young Takuto Izumi Voiced by: Miyuki Matsushita
Adult Takuto Izumi Voiced by: Takehito Koyasu

Serika Izumi (泉 芹香, Izumi Serika) Voiced by: Kumiko Nishihara

Yugo Izumi (泉 ユーゴ, Izumi Yugo) Voiced by: Etsuko Nishimoto

Nanjo Akihito (明仁 南城, Akihito Nanjo) Voiced by: Masami Kikuchi

Madoka Shibuya (渋谷 まどか, Shibuya Madoka) Voiced by: Omi Minami

Mieko Minamimoto (皆本 美恵子, Minamimoto Mieko) Voiced by: Rei Igarashi

Toshiyuki Takasaka (タカサカ 俊之, Takasaka Toshiyuki) Voiced by: Tohru Furusawa

Takuto's Mother (拓人の母, Takuto no okasan) Voiced by: Tomoko Munakata

Katsumi Shibuya (渋谷 勝美, Shibuya Katsumi)

== Development and release ==
Zetsuai 1989 originated as a spin-off of Dokusen Yoku, a doujinshi (self-published fan comic) by author Minami Ozaki based on the manga series Captain Tsubasa. The pairing of Kōjirō Hyūga and Ken Wakashimazu, featured in Dokusen Yoku, is immensely popular and has been compared to the classic slash fiction pairing of Kirk/Spock. The usual dynamic in Kōjirō/Ken doujinshi is that their relationship is based on trust. Kōjirō is the man of the family due to his father's death. Ken on the other hand, is heir to a martial arts school, and is constantly under pressure to quit soccer, and suffers an injury from trying to be the best in both fields. The boys support each other and eventually their deep friendship becomes love. The original Zetsuai was abandoned after 5 volumes. Minami Ozaki later picked the story back up in 1992 with Bronze. Since then, Bronze has outpaced the original Zetsuai with 14 volumes, with the current story arc called "Restart".

The word "Zetsu-ai" is a compound created by Minami Ozaki which has been translated as "desperate love". Ozaki's preferred English translation is "Everlasting Love". Many western yaoi fans got their introduction to the genre through this series, which defined the genre for them.

As of 2003, fan translations of the first eleven volumes of Zetsuai / Bronze were available.

Zetsuai 1989 was licensed in French (by Tonkam), German (Carlsen Verlag), Korean, Spanish (Glénat España) and Italian (Panini Comics) languages. It was the first shōnen-ai manga to be officially translated into German.

== Media ==
=== Manga ===
==== Zetsuai 1989 ====
No.	Original release date	Original ISBN	Other release date	Other ISBN
1	30 January 1990	4-08-849611-6	—	3-551-74776-8 (Germany); ISBN 2-84580-042-8 (France)
Koji wakes up to find himself in a strange bed. He learns that Takuto Izumi found him passed out in the street, and took him home, along with a puppy Izumi found near Koji. Koji remains for some time with Izumi, as he believes that when he was younger he had fallen in love with Izumi's sister Serika. Izumi ignores a high temperature and goes to a soccer match. He helps the team win, but loses consciousness after the final whistle. Koji brings him to the hospital and on impulse almost kisses Izumi, but is scared of the attraction between them and decides to channel his feelings towards Serika. Koji does not want to return to his rock star lifestyle, despite the admonition of his manager Katsumi Shibuya. Izumi sees a newspaper article with a photo of Koji and Izumi at the soccer match with the caption "Found Koji!" Izumi is infuriated.
2	23 April 1990	4-08-849639-6	—	3-551-74777-6 (Germany); ISBN 2-84580-043-6 (France)
Koji's fans besiege Izumi's house, asking painful questions about his past and his relationship with Koji. When Izumi is finally able to get rid of the fans, Koji himself comes to talk to Izumi. He had realised that Izumi intended not to become a famous soccer player because he did not want to draw attention to his younger sister Serika and brother Yugo, who live with relatives. Izumi's mother had killed her husband, and that is why Izumi, who was always bullied for being a murderer's son, is afraid that revealing the past may affect the future of Serika and Yugo. Koji realizes that he is in love with Takuto, and that the girl on a soccer field six years ago, who he secretly admired, was in fact not Serika, but Takuto. Koji promises to leave Izumi alone and starts dating the famous movie actress Mieko Minamimoto, though in an interview, Koji mentions the unnamed person he truly loves. The interview is read by Serika, who guesses the person Koji loves is her brother. She has also suspected for a long time that Izumi intentionally played badly in soccer matches to avoid attention and hide their past. She tries to apologise to him, but Takuto says he is going to quit soccer completely. Koji intervenes in the conversation and during the fight between them, Serika runs onto the road and almost gets hit by a car. Izumi rushes to push her off the road, but Koji saves Serika instead (actually trying to save Izumi) and breaks his hand in the process. Izumi sees no reason for Koji to protect his sister and decides that Koji must be in love with Serika.
3	30 July 1990	4-08-849666-3	—	3-551-74778-4 (Germany); ISBN 2-84580-044-4 (France)
Koji can't stand being away from Izumi, so he arranges a transfer to the same school. Izumi tries to ignore him at first. When he goes to a soccer field for training, Koji is willing to be a goalkeeper. He explains he likes soccer and especially Izumi's playing. They establish almost friendly relationships. Koji again begins to meet with his former lover Mieko, and even flirts with her younger sister. He uses both of them to deflect the paparazzi's attention from Izumi. On the other hand, Izumi still believes that Koji is in love with Serika, so he is very irritated about Koji's unfaithful behaviour. He demands that Koji say, definitely, who he loves. Koji confesses that he truly loves Izumi, but to quickly avoid an argument, pretends it was just a joke. Izumi is evicted from his house due to a "no pets" rule, so Koji's manager Shibuya offers Izumi lodging at an apartment with him and Koji.
4	30 November 1990	4-08-849703-1	—	3-551-74779-2 (Germany); ISBN 2-84580-105-X (France)
Izumi tries to find a new home, but with no success because he owns a dog. When he goes food shopping and leaves the puppy alone for a moment, it runs under a car and dies. In a state of emotional shock, Izumi goes to Koji's apartment, as he has nowhere else to go. Koji pulls him round and puts him to bed. Shibuya, watching them together, understands that Koji is secretly in love. Shibuya clarifies that being homosexual could destroy Koji's career, though Koji doesn't bother listening to him. Finally, he breaks up with Mieko. Izumi is appointed captain of the soccer team, so he decides to give up all his part-time jobs and concentrate on soccer. As Koji has previously offered lodging with him and Shibuya, Izumi agrees and decides to do the cooking and cleaning as a payment. Permanently being near Izumi is agonising for Koji, so he spends a lot of time in the recording studio and tries to keep silent about his feelings, but one day confesses everything to Izumi. Izumi feels nothing but bewilderment, fear and disgust. Koji attempts to rape him, but comes to his senses at the last moment. Next day, soccer fan Minako asks Izumi out. He agrees, hoping that it will help him get rid of Koji.
5	30 March 1991	4-08-849740-6	—	3-551-74780-6 (Germany); ISBN 2-84580-106-8 (France)
Izumi tells Koji that he is ready to forget about what had happened between them. He begins to date Minako and ignores Koji. Koji goes crazy with jealousy and rapes Minako, accusing Izumi of using the girl to escape from Koji's feelings. Next morning Izumi accidentally meets his mother, who he thought had died twelve years ago. She recollects the day when she killed her husband and injured Izumi. She tells Izumi that his father could not find happiness with her, so, yearning to possess him fully, she killed him. Takuto ran out to protect his father and got injured too, but his mother swears she didn't want to hurt Takuto, because she loved him and always will. When she leaves, Koji says he had a strange feeling that she has waited for twelve years to apologise to Izumi and has no reason to live anymore. Indeed, she commits suicide by jumping from a rooftop. Shibuya moves away from their apartment, so Koji and Izumi can now live together. Izumi agrees to accept Koji's feelings, because he doesn't see any other way. Although Izumi is not sure that he is capable of feeling love, Koji wants to be close to him anyway.

==== Bronze: Zetsuai Since 1989 ====
No.	Japanese release date	Japanese ISBN
1	29 January 1992	4-08-849841-0
Izumi is tormented by nightmares after sleeping with Koji. Koji tries not to aggravate the situation. He spends nights with women, and Izumi is insanely jealous when he detects the smell of their perfume. The soccer/football association of Italy invites Izumi to train there, but he is not ready to make a decision about moving abroad, so the coach invites him for a brief visit to Italy instead. Koji makes a speech during one of his performances, saying he has decided to end his career as a singer. The next morning Izumi leaves for Italy, leaving a note promising to return in a week. Koji drops everything and races to the airport on his motorcycle, but on the way he gets into an accident and falls into a coma. Izumi finds out about this upon returning to Japan. Shibuya blames Izumi for what happened. Both Izumi and Shibuya keep hoping that Koji would wake up, but time passes, and nothing happens. The soccer coach cannot understand why Izumi is hesitating and stalling, and finally warns him that Italy will not wait forever. Izumi decides that he must keep living, even if Koji dies.
2	28 July 1993	4-08-848113-5
3	30 January 1994	4-08-848173-9
4	30 May 1994	4-08-848213-1
5	30 July 1994	4-08-848233-6
6	21 December 1994	4-08-848283-2
7	20 December 1995	4-08-848436-3
8	21 December 1996	4-08-848585-8
9	24 March 1997	4-08-848624-2
10	30 November 1998	4-08-848883-0
11	30 January 2000	4-08-847165-2
12	30 March 2003	4-08-847609-3
13	30 September 2003	4-08-847665-4
14	24 March 2006	4-08-846040-5

=== OVAs ===
Two original video animations (OVAs) were made, one taking place in Zetsuai [Since] 1989, and the second during Bronze: Zetsuai since 1989 (also called Bronze Zetsuai or simply Bronze). Koyasu Takehito plays the part of Izumi Takuto, and Sho Hayami plays Koji Nanjo. Radio dramas and CDs (with some lyrics composed by Minami Ozaki) were produced. The actors themselves often provided vocal parts for music. Five original music videos were made and compiled into a video called Cathexis.

=== Soundtrack ===
Several albums were released relating to the Dokusen Yoku doujinshi, Zetsuai 1989 and Bronze since Zetsuai between 1988 and 1996.

=== Light novels ===
Several light novels were published by Shueisha. They were written by Akiyama Rin with illustrations by Minami Ozaki. The plot of novels is mostly connected to Nanjo family (Kaen Danshō series in particular), for example Kouji's elder brother Nanjo Hirose.

#	Title	Japanese title	Released	ISBN
1	Kaen Danshō	華冤断章 小説	18 July 1997	ISBN 4-08-702004-5
2	Zetsuai Since 1989	絶愛 Since 1989	15 December 1997	ISBN 4-08-702008-8
3	Kaen Danshō – Uragirimono no Matsuei	華冤断章－裏切り者の末裔－小説	16 January 1998	ISBN 4-08-702010-X
4	Kaen Danshō – Yami no Sumu Ie, King no Umareru Machi	華冤断章－悪魔の棲む地下 帝王の生誕れる街－小説	5 August 1998	ISBN 4-08-702012-6

== Reception ==
At the time of its writing, the genre as a whole was not commonly recognised by those not creating it, but Zetsuai 1989 is considered one of yaoi's "major works" and "one of the greatest icons of shōnen-ai". Koji and Izumi have been described as shōnen-ai's Romeo and Juliet. There is little explicit sex in the series. Instead, the series is "angst-ridden", and includes "a lot of blood" via themes of self-harm and accidents. Ozaki's works have been described as "prolonged erotic psychodramas", and Zetsuai 1989 is the "most famous" of these. Many western yaoi fans got their introduction to the genre through this series, which defined the genre for them.

Critics have commented on the series' melodramatic plot its "semi-insane characters", and for the controversial style of its artwork. The depiction of love in the series has been described as "nearly violent", which is regarded as a "true revelation" for female readers. The character of Izumi's mother has been criticised by Kazuko Suzuki as an example of yaoi showing "extremely negative images of mothers". Anime News Network has criticised the melodramatic tone of the OVA Bronze: Zetsuai Since 1989. described the art style of Zetsuai as being "like a fashion designer's workbook", but Anime News Network says that the character design is "horribly mutated" and "disgusting". Rachel Thorn describes the relationship between Koji Nanjo and Takuto Izumi as an "intense and often grim love story", saying that "if you like your shônen-ai (or "slash") intense, look no further."
