= List of 07-Ghost chapters =

The cover of the first volume of 07 Ghost as published by Ichijinsha on November 25, 2005, in Japan.

The chapters of the manga series 07-Ghost are written and illustrated by Yuki Amemiya and Yukino Ichihara. The series focuses on Teito Klein, a former slave sent to attend the Barsburg Empire's military academy due to his ability to use Zaiphon, a type of supernatural power. The ability is rare, and thus highly prized. Teito is an amnesiac and doesn't remember anything of his origins – what he does learn of his past comes from his recurring and often traumatizing dreams.

07-Ghost was serialized in the monthly magazine Monthly Comic Zero Sum, published by Ichijinsha. Seventeen tankoban volumes have been released. The first volume released on November 25, 2005, and the final on September 25, 2013. The manga was licensed by Go! Comi for release in North America. Viz Media has since picked up the license for the series, after Go!Comi closed, after only releasing the first 3 volumes of 07-Ghost.

== Volume list ==
Note: Only the first three volumes were released in English by Go!Comi before they closed; both the Go!Comi and Viz Media release dates and ISBNs are listed for volumes 1–3. From volume 4 onwards, the only release dates and ISBNs are that of Viz Media.

No.	Japanese release date	Japanese ISBN	North American release date	North American ISBN
1	November 25, 2005	978-4-7580-5193-4	November 29, 2008 (Go!Comi edition); November 13, 2012 (Viz Media edition)	978-1-60510-032-6 (Go!Comi edition); ISBN 1421549948 (Viz Media edition)
1. "Escape"; 2. "The Seventh District"; 3. "Darkness"; 4. "Kor"; 5. "Violation"
The story begins with a young Teito remembering a memory from his past; walking through a place while the snow falls gently all around him. The memory feels nostalgic to him, but he finds that he can't remember anything about it. It later switches to present day, where a 15- to 16-year-old Teito is walking along the halls of the Military Academy, while others whisper behind his back about how he is the model student and that he used to be a slave. There is also quite a bit of tension because the exams are starting soon, and only 20 of the 500 students will pass. Teito overhears Shuuri Oak and his friends mocking him because of his shortness and is about to turn around to yell at them when another young student puts a hand on his shoulder, addressing him teasingly as 'young master Teito Klein'. Teito whirls around to backhand slap Mikage, stating that he knew it was him since they've been friends for a year already. Mikage cheerfully suggests that they eat lunch together, even when Teito grudgingly tells him that if Mikage hangs out with him, the others will bully him, too. The two decide to train their Zaiphon techniques, while Teito briefly explains the type of magic used in their world (it is covered in much more detail later on). Teito and Mikage begin the exam the next day and are doing well, until Teito is supposed to deal the killing blow to the condemned criminal that they are assigned to kill in order to pass; Teito tells him to surrender so that he doesn't have to kill him, but Ayanami intervenes and murders the criminal before he gets a chance to answer. When Mikage and Teito go back to their dorm room, Teito is still shaken after seeing the criminal killed; Mikage asks him if anything is wrong, and Teito talks about how he thinks of Mikage as the family he never had after Mikage says that they're best friends. Mikage then suggests that they make a promise that they will die together. The next morning, Teito is going to hand in a late assignment when he overhears Ayanami talking about him. Suddenly, he has flashes of a memory where Ayanami is standing over his dead father, having just killed him. Teito suddenly seems to be possessed by something and rushes into the room, only to be imprisoned for attempting to kill Ayanami. Mikage comes to help him escape, only to find that Teito has managed to fight past the guards by himself. The two flee the building, but are cornered on a balcony. Teito pretends to hold Mikage hostage, threatening to kill him; however, he whispers to Mikage, "We'll always be best friends, right?" After Mikage replies "Of course", Teito jumps off the balcony onto a waiting hawkzile (a kind of flying motorcycle) to escape. While escaping the military, Teito falls of his hawksile and lands on a blonde Bishop name Frau. Frau and two other Bishops (Labrador and Castor) take him to the seventh district, also known as "God's Territory" where the military are forbidden to enter. The church harbors him, and heals his wounds. While his stay, Teito hears the story of the war ten years ago, where the kingdom of Raggs fell. He also hears rumors of the seven ghosts sent from heaven to defeat the death god Verloren.
2	May 25, 2006	978-4-7580-5225-2	March 2009 (Go!Comi edition); January 8, 2013	978-1-60510-033-3 (Go!Comi edition); ISBN 1421549956 (Viz Media edition)
6. "Awakening"; 7. "Cycle of Rebirth"; 8. "Mikhail"; 9. "Atonement"; 10. "Nightmare"; 11. "Nightmare" (2)
Chief Ayanami chases Teito around the church in Mikage's body, after possessing him. Ayanami attaches a choker that seals all that could be seen as actions of disloyalty. However, Teito loses consciousness by trying to take his own life, and while unconscious, meets an angelic being sealed in his mind. He then is put under a possessed like state, and a consciousness other than his own takes over his body. Frau comes and rescues him before any serious damage is done, and Ayanami releases Mikage's body. Mikage vanishes, leaving Teito distraught. However, this fate becomes what drives Teito, and later becomes and inspiration to learn how to use a Bascule (a tool used to channel Zaiphon), and become a Bishop.
3	November 25, 2006	978-4-7580-5261-0	May 10, 2009 (Go!Comi edition); March 12, 2013 (Viz Media edition)	978-1-60510-034-0 (Go!Comi edition); 978-1421549965 (Viz Media edition)
12. "Nightmare" (3); 13. "Nightmare" (4); 14. "Nightmare" (5); 15. "Nightmare" (6); 16. "Nightmare" (7); 17. "Nightmare" (8)
The series' third entry leads Teito to the dark secrets kept by the man who raised him. Teito, an orphan and former slave, attends the swanky Barsburg Academy where, much to the amazement of his classmates, he aces the graduation exam. Things are looking up for the lonely orphan boy, until a chance meeting with the man who murdered his father changes his life forever. Fleeing to another empire, Teito is soon embroiled in a war between an evil god and seven ghosts. He's also in possession of a mysterious new power that could have devastating repercussions for the future of the planet – and for Teito's own past. While Teito tries to uncover the truth about the Father and the apocalyptic Pandora's box, Ayami's faithful follower, Kuroyuri, frames Frau for a crime so heinous it could mean Frau's execution. (Amazon.com)
4	May 25, 2007	978-4-7580-5290-0	May 14, 2013	978-1421549972
18. "Nightmare" (9); 19. "Nightmare" (10); 20. "Song for Souls' Repose ~Requiem~"; 21. "The Morning of The Bishop Exam"; 22. "The Final Door"; 23. "The Bridge of Tribulation"; 23.5 "Extra Supreme Sugar"
Teito is faced with the momentous task of passing the tests to become a bishop when he can't even control a bascule! But even greater than Teito's personal troubles are the disturbing circumstances surrounding the murder of a criminal, and the appearance of the deadly Wars heralded by a prophecy that may soon be fulfilled... (goodreads.com)
5	November 24, 2007	978-4-7580-5320-4	July 16, 2013	978-1421549989
24. "Light and Dark"; 25. "Setting Off"; 26. "Antwort"; 27. "Slave Trader"; 28. "The 6th District"; 29. "Housen House"
6	May 24, 2008	978-4-7580-5347-1	September 10, 2013	978-1421549996
30. "Hausen House" (2); 31. "Hausen House" (3); 32. "Hausen House" (4); 33. "Barrier 5"; 34. "Candle Flame"; 34.5 "Aspiration"; 35. "The Hated One"
7	November 25, 2008	978-4-7580-5376-1	November 12, 2013	978-1421560373
36. "Tatto"; 37. "Recollection"; 38. "Evidence"; 39. "Division"; 40. "Lingering Snow"; 41. "Omen"
8	May 25, 2009	978-4-7580-5415-7	January 14, 2014	978-1421560380
42. "Relikt"; 43. "Pandora's Box"; 44. "Fate"; 45. "The Unattainable Madness"; 46. "Kagome, Kagome"; 47. "The Same Hands"
9	November 25, 2009	978-4-7580-5466-9	March 11, 2014	978-1421560397
48. "Chance Meeting"; 49. "Paradise of Oblivion" (1); 50. "Paradise of Oblivion" (2); 51. "Paradise of Oblivion" (3); 52. "Paradise of Oblivion" (4); 53. "Prophet"; 54. "JOKER"
10	August 25, 2010	978-4-7580-5538-3	May 13, 2014	978-1421563954
55. "Almarz Mansion"; 56. "The Neverending Day"; 57. "Capella"; 58. "Doubt"; 59. "Hawkzile Race"; 60. "Predator"; 61. "Runaway"
11	January 25th, 2011	978-4-7580-5576-5	July 8, 2014	978-1421563961
62. "50/50"; 63. "The Villain"; 64. "Roseamanelle Ouka Barsburg"; 65. "Tiashe" (1); 66. "Tiashe" (2); 67. "Tiashe" (3)
12	July 25th, 2011	978-4-7580-5624-3	September 9, 2014	978-1421563978
068. The Land of Seele; 069. Confrontation; 070. Separation; 071. Disappearance; 072. Déjà vu; 073. Curse
13	December 24th, 2011	978-4758-05679-3	November 11, 2014	978-1421564302
074. Impatient; 075. Younger Brother; 076. Ea; 077. Black Pearl; 078. Cage; 079. Emperor; 080. Masquerade: First Part; 081. Masquerade: Last Part
14	June 25, 2012	978-4758-05728-8	January 6, 2015	978-1421575292
082. Reunion; 083. Replica; 084. Replica 2; 085. Replica 3; 086. Confession; 087. Millea Klein; 088. Landkarte; 089. The Never-Ending Night 1; 090. The Never-Ending Night 2; 091. The Never-Ending Night 3; 092. The Never-Ending Night 4
15	December 25, 2012	978-4758-05776-9	March 10, 2015	978-1421575308
093. Release; 094. Something that Exists at the End of Darkness; 095. Door
16	May 25, 2013	978-4758-05821-6	May 12, 2015	978-1421577784
96. Baton
17	September 25, 2013	978-4758-05821-6	July 14, 2015	978-1421577944
