= Show Hayami =

Japanese actor and singer

- 速水 奨
- Born: Yasushi Ōhama; Takasago, Hyōgo, Japan
- Occupations: Actor; voice actor; singer
- Years active: 1980–present
- Agent: Rush Style
- Notable work: Bleach as Sousuke Aizen; Macross as Maximilian Jenius; Fairy Tail as Ichiya Vandalay Kotobuki; Dragon Ball Z as Zarbon
- Spouse: Rei Igarashi (m. 1985)

Yasushi Ōhama (大濱 靖, Ōhama Yasushi), known professionally as Show Hayami (速水 奨, Hayami Shō), is a Japanese actor, voice actor and singer. He is mainly known for his smooth, deep voice. He has played a wide range of characters from kind-hearted heroes (Father Remington, Maximilian Jenius, Nicholas D. Wolfwood) to twisted sociopaths (Sousuke Aizen, Muraki Kazutaka, Enrico Maxwell, Juo Kurohagi, and LoL champion Jhin). He is married to Rei Igarashi and works for Rush Style.

== Filmography ==
=== Anime series ===
1981

- Queen Millennia, Millennium Thief A (as Yasushi Ōhama)

1982

- Armored Fleet Dairugger XV, Tatsuo Izumo
- The Super Dimension Fortress Macross, Maximilian Jenius
- The New Adventures of Maya the Honey Bee, Max

1983

- Aura Battler Dunbine, Burn Bunnings
- Kinnikuman: Scramble for the Throne, Terryman, The Ninja, The Hawkman
- The Super Dimension Century Orguss, Kei Katsuragi

1984

- Heavy Metal L-Gaim, Gavlet Gablae, Preita Quoize

1986

- Ginga: Nagareboshi Gin, Kisaragi
- Machine Robo: Revenge of Cronos, Narrator
- The Transformers: The Movie, Ultra Magnus

1987

- Machine Robo: Battle Hackers, Narrator
- Zillion, Baron Ricks

1988

- Hades Project Zeorymer, Ritsu
- The Burning Wild Man, Akira Shiranui
- Saint Seiya, Sea Horse Baian
- Transformers: Super-God Masterforce, Sixknight
- Zillion: Bruning Night, Rick

1989

- Earthian, Taki
- Legend of Heavenly Sphere Shurato, Harmony God Scrimil
- Ranma ½, Ushinosuke Oshamanbe
- Zetsuai 1989, Koji Nanjo

1990

- Devil Hunter Yohko, Hideki
- Dragon Ball Z, Zarbon
- Project A-ko, Gail
- RG Veda, Yasha-ō
- The Three-Eyed One, Kido
- Mado King Granzort, Iceban

1991

- Brave Exkaiser, Exkaiser
- Future GPX Cyber Formula, Osamu Sugo/Knight Shoemach
- Kyatto Ninden Teyandee, Prince

1992

- Ai no Kusabi, Raoul Am
- Nangoku Shōnen Papuwa-kun, Magic Sōsui
- The Brave Fighter of Legend Da-Garn, Da-Garn

1993

- The Irresponsible Captain Tylor, Lieutenant Makoto Yamamoto

1994

- Macross 7, Maximilian Jenius

1995

- Macross Plus, Marge

1996

- Mobile Suit Gundam: The 08th MS Team, Rear Admiral Ginias Saharin
- Sailor Stars, Takuya Moroboshi
- Shinesman, Ryoichi Hayami/Shinesman Moss Green

1997

- Cutie Honey Flash, Twilight Prince/Prince Zera

1998

- All Purpose Cultural Cat-Girl Nuku Nuku DASH!, Dr. Higuchi
- Detective Conan, Hamura Shuuichi (Ep. 88–89)
- Record of Lodoss War: Chronicles of the Heroic Knight, Ashram
- Trigun, Nicholas D. Wolfwood
- Serial Experiments Lain, Deus / Eiri Masami

1999

- Pet Shop of Horrors, Iason Grey

2000

- Yami no Matsuei, Kazutaka Muraki
- Ghost Stories, Da Vinci

2002

- Detective Conan: The Phantom of Baker Street, Jack the Ripper
- Gravion, Klein Sandman
- Mirage of Blaze, Naoe Nobutsuna
- Samurai Deeper Kyo, Oda Nobunaga

2003

- Chrono Crusade, Father Ewan Remington
- Machine Robo Rescue, Machine Commander Robo
- Sonic X, Dr. Yuio aka Dr. Norman (Special ep. 21) (Japan only)

2004

- Angelique (OVA), Julious
- Fullmetal Alchemist, Frank Archer
- Gravion Zwei, Klein Sandman
- Phantom - The Animation, Raymond McGuire
- Samurai Champloo, Shōryū (Ep. 10)
- Yakitate Japan, Meister Kirisaki

2005

- Basilisk: The Kouga Ninja Scrolls, Yakushiji Tenzen
- Black Cat, Charden Flamberg
- Bleach, Sousuke Aizen
- Hell Girl, Gorō Ishizu
- Peach Girl, Ryo Okayasu
- Pokémon, Juan
- SoltyRei, John Kimberley
- Transformers: Cybertron, Vector Prime, Narrator

2006

- Brave Story: New Traveler, Leynart
- Buso Renkin, Showusei Sakaguchi
- Detective Conan, Rausu Tatsuhiko (Ep. 452)
- Futari wa Pretty Cure Splash Star: Tick-Tack Kiki Ippatsu!, Sirloin

2007

- Baccano!, President of DD News
- Detective Conan, Minowa Shouhei (Ep. 490)
- Ghost Hound, Masato Kaibara/Snark
- Gintama, Umibouzu
- Juushin Enbu-Hero Tales, Shoukaku
- Kaze no Stigma, TBC
- Prism Ark, Darkness Knight, Meister
- Saint Beast, Lucifer

2008

- Allison & Lillia, Owen Nicht (eps 7–8)
- Golgo 13, Leader
- Tales of the Abyss, Lorelei

2009

- 07-Ghost, Ayanami
- Detective Conan, Morofushi Takaaki
- Metal Fight Beyblade, Ryūsei Hagane / Phoenix
- Sengoku Basara, Akechi Mitsuhide
- White Album, Ogata Eiji

2010

- Digimon Xros Wars, Wisemon
- Fairy Tail, Ichiya Vandalay Kotobuki/Nichiya
- Fullmetal Alchemist: Brotherhood, Judau

2011

- Fate/Zero, Tokiomi Tōsaka
- Marvel Anime: Wolverine, Juo Kurohagi
- Gosick, Levianthan
- Pretty Cure All Stars DX3: Mirai ni Todoke! Sekai o Tsunagu Niji-Iro no Hana, Sirloin
- Shakugan no Shana III, Sairei no Hebi

2012

- K, Miwa Ichigen
- Saint Seiya Ω, Tokisada

2013

- AKB0048, Mr. Sono
- Brothers Conflict, Ryusei
- High School DxD New, Lord Gremory
- Problem Children Are Coming from Another World, Aren't They?, Jack-o'-lantern
- Tokyo Ravens, Tsuchimikado Yasuzumi
- Samurai Flamenco, King Torture

2014

- Aldnoah.Zero, Cruhteo
- Buddy Complex, Gengo Kuramitsu
- Buddy Complex Kanketsu-hen: Ano Sora ni Kaeru Mirai de, Gengo Kuramitsu
- Gonna be the Twin-Tail!!, Spider Guildy
- Is the Order a Rabbit?, Takahiro Kafu
- Shirogane no Ishi Argevollen, Julius Unios
- Tokyo Ghoul, Kōsuke Hōji

2015

- Aldnoah.Zero Season 2, Cruhteo
- Assassination Classroom, Asano Gakuhō
- High School DxD BorN, Lord Gremory
- JoJo's Bizarre Adventure: Stardust Crusaders, Vanilla Ice
- Castle Town Dandelion, Borscht
- Shimoneta: A Boring World Where the Concept of Dirty Jokes Doesn't Exist, narration, Base Black
- Chivalry of a Failed Knight, Itsuki Kurogane
- Ninja Slayer From Animation, Fujio Katakura/Dark Ninja
- Mobile Suit Gundam: Iron-Blooded Orphans, Iznario Fareed
- Is the Order a Rabbit?? Season 2, Takahiro Kafu

2016

- Assassination Classroom Season 2, Asano Gakuhō
- Drifters, Akechi Mitsuhide
- Undefeated Bahamut Chronicle, Warg-Kreutzer
- Maho Girls PreCure!, Shakince
- Taboo Tattoo, Professor Wiseman
- Active Raid, Kyokai-sama

2017

- My First Girlfriend Is a Gal, IkemenJunichi (ep. 2, 5,)
- Digimon Universe: Appli Monsters, Leviathan
- Food Wars! Shokugeki no Soma: The Third Plate, Azami Nakiri
- Altair: A Record of Battles, King Zsigmond III

2018

- Cardfight!! Vanguard G: Z, Gyze (Episode 20, 21, 22, 23 as credited in the credits roll)
- Gundam Build Divers, Rommel
- Angolmois: Record of Mongol Invasion, Hindun
- Goblin Slayer, Bard, Minstrel
- Gakuen Basara, Akechi Mitsuhide
- Ace Attorney Season 2, Tristan Turnbull
- Radiant, Narrator

2019

- Gundam Build Divers Re:Rise, Captain Zeon
- Ascendance of a Bookworm, Ferdinand, Narrator
- Actors: Songs Connection, Tsukasa Odawara
- Food Wars! Shokugeki no Soma: The Fourth Plate, Azami Nakiri

2020

- Somali and the Forest Spirit, Musurika
- Auto Boy - Carl from Mobile Land, Ruster
- Ascendance of a Bookworm 2nd Season, Ferdinand, Narrator
- Fire Force Season 2, Yata
- Hypnosis Mic: Division Rap Battle: Rhyme Anima, Jakurai Jinguji
- Dragon Quest: The Adventure of Dai, Baran
- Is the Order a Rabbit? BLOOM, Takahiro Kafu

2021

- Cells at Work!!, M Cell
- Idoly Pride, Kyoichi Asakura
- Farewell, My Dear Cramer, Masahiro Gotōda
- Record of Ragnarok, Odin
- Gunma-chan, Professor Monoshiri
- 180-Byō de Kimi no Mimi o Shiawase ni Dekiru ka?, Jirō
- The Vampire Dies in No Time, Draus

2022

- Requiem of the Rose King, Richard, Duke of York
- Cap Kakumei Bottleman DX, Io Hocari
- Estab Life: Great Escape, Aruga
- Don't Hurt Me, My Healer!, Cow
- The Eminence in Shadow, Lord Perv Asshat
- Ascendance of a Bookworm 3rd Season, Ferdinand, Narrator
- Phantom of the Idol, Narrator
- Bleach: Thousand-Year Blood War, Sousuke Aizen

2023

- Trigun Stampede, Religious Radio DJ
- KamiKatsu, Soichiro Urabe
- Hypnosis Mic: Division Rap Battle: Rhyme Anima+, Jakurai Jinguji
- Shangri-La Frontier, Wezaemon the Tombguard
- Jujutsu Kaisen, Larue

2024

- Grendizer U, Gennosuke Yumi
- Demon Slayer: Kimetsu no Yaiba, Kasugaigarasu (Kagaya's Crow)
- Black Butler, Johann Agares (Lower Master of Weston College)
- Our Last Crusade or the Rise of a New World Season II (Magnacasa Gunfight)
- Orb: On the Movements of the Earth (Hubert)

2025

- A Wild Last Boss Appeared!, Demon King Orm

2026

- High School! Kimengumi, Kou Irooto
- Ascendance of a Bookworm: Adopted Daughter of an Archduke, Ferdinand, Narrator, Stenluke
- Kusunoki's Garden of Gods, Kirin
- My Ribdiculous Reincarnation, God of Creation
- The Cat and the Dragon, Kurobane
- The Seven Knights of the Marronnier Kingdom, Narrator

2027

- Mercedes and the Waning Moon, Bernhard

=== Original net animation ===
- 7 Seeds (2019), Takashi
- The Way of the Househusband (2021), Bar Master
- Bastard!! 2nd Season (2023), Nils John Mifune
- Yu-Gi-Oh! Card Game The Chronicles (2026), Dogmatika Ashiyan

=== Original video animation ===
- Dream Hunter Rem (1985), Enkō
- Megazone 23 Part II (1986), Yuuichiro Shiratori
- Dr. Slump: Arale-chan - The Penguin Village Fire Brigade (1986), Butao-kun
- Devilman (1987), Akira Fudo/Devilman
- Kaze to Ki no Uta (1987), Jack Dren
- Be-Boy Kidnapp'n Idol (1989), Kou Umiura
- B.B. Burning Blood (1990), Jin Moriyama
- Zetsuai 1989 (1992), Koji Nanjo
- Please Save My Earth (1993), Shion
- Bronze: Cathexis (1994), Koji Nanjo
- Fatal Fury: The Motion Picture (1994), Hauer Blitzer
- Bronze: Zetsuai Since 1989 (1996), Koji Nanjo
- Mirage of Blaze: Rebels of the River Edge (2004), Naoe Nobutsuna
- Hellsing Ultimate (2006), Enrico Maxwell
- Legend of the Galactic Heroes (????), Adalbert von Fahrenheit
- Record of Lodoss War (????), Orson
- Voltage Fighter Gowcaizer (????), Master Ohga/Shizuru Osaki
- Is the Order a Rabbit?? ~Sing For You~ (2019), Takahiro Kafu
- Ascendance of a Bookworm: Side Story (2020), Ferdinand, Narrator

=== Anime films ===
- Dragon Ball Z: Cooler's Revenge (1991), Sauzer
- Legend of the Galactic Heroes: Overture to a New War (1993), Adalbert von Fahrenheit
- Trigun: Badlands Rumble (2010), Nicholas D. Wolfwood
- Is the Order a Rabbit?? ~Dear My Sister~ (2017), Takahiro Kafu
- Dakaichi: Spain Arc (2021), Celes
- Jujutsu Kaisen 0 (2021), Larue
- Detective Conan: One-Eyed Flashback (2025), Takaaki Morofushi
- Dream Animals: The Movie (2025), Three Polinkies
- Crayon Shin-chan the Movie: Super Hot! The Spicy Kasukabe Dancers (2025), Dill
- Labyrinth (2026), Shiori's father

=== Tokusatsu ===
- Kamen Rider Zero-One (2020), Ark, Kamen Rider Ark-Zero
- Kamen Rider Genms - Smart Brain and the 1000% Crisis (2022), Ark
- No.1 Sentai Gozyuger: TegaSword of Resurrection (2025), Pestis

=== Live-action film ===
- Anime Supremacy! (2022), stone (voice)

=== Video games ===
- Voltage Fighter Gowcaizer (1995), Master Ohga/Shizuru Osaki
- Angelique series (1995-), Julious
- Armored Core: Project Phantasma (1997), Stinger
- Mobile Suit Gundam Side Story: The Blue Destiny (1997), Nimbus Schterzen
- Tobal 2 (1997), Mark the Devil
- Tales of Destiny (1997), Woodrow Kelvin
- JoJo's Bizarre Adventure (1998), Vanilla Ice
- Persona 2: Innocent Sin (1999), Ginji Sasaki
- The Legend of Dragoon (1999), Lloyd Noril
- Space Channel 5 (1999), Jaguar
- Super Robot Wars Alpha (2000), Laodicea Judecca Gozzo, Burn Burnings, Black Knight, Maximilian Jenius
- Super Robot Wars Alpha Gaiden (2001), Maximilian Jenius
- Atelier Lilie: The Alchemist of Salburg 3 (2001), Ulrich Morgen
- Space Channel 5: Part 2 (2002), Shadow/Jaguar
- Tales of Destiny 2 (2002), Garr Kelvin
- Tokimeki Memorial Girl's Side (2002), Goro Hanatsubaki
- Armored Core Nexus (2004), Stinger (Revolution Disc)
- Super Robot Wars Alpha 3 (2005), Ephesus Judecca Gozzo, Sardis Judecca Gozzo, Philadelphia Judecca Gozzo, Maximilian Jenius
- Sengoku Basara (2005), Akechi Mitsuhide/Tenkai
- Phantasy Star Universe (2006), Izuma Rutsu
- Tales of the World: Radiant Mythology (2006), Garr Kelvin
- Star Ocean: First Departure (2007), Jie Revorse
- Super Robot Wars A Portable (2007), Ginias Sahalin
- Armored Core: For Answer (2008), Malzel
- Super Robot Wars Z (2008), Kei Katsuragi, Klein Sandman
- Dragon Ball: Raging Blast 2 (2010), Sauzer
- Super Robot Wars Z2: Destruction Chapter (2011), Kei Katsuragi
- Bleach: Soul Resurrection (2011), Sousuke Aizen
- Super Robot Wars Z2: Rebirth Chapter (2012), Pol Potaria, Kei Katsuragi, Klein Sandman
- JoJo's Bizarre Adventure: All Star Battle (2013), Enrico Pucci
- Saint Seiya: Brave Soldiers (2013), Sea Horse Baian
- J-Stars Victory VS (2014), Sousuke Aizen
- Super Robot Wars Z3: Hell Chapter (2014), Kei Katsuragi
- Super Robot Wars Z3: Heaven Chapter (2015), Kei Katsuragi
- Return to PopoloCrois: A Story of Seasons Fairytale (2015), Gomer
- Saint Seiya: Soldiers' Soul (2015), Seahorse Baian
- Project X Zone 2: Brave New World (2015), Shadow
- JoJo's Bizarre Adventure: Eyes of Heaven (2015), Vanilla Ice
- Granblue Fantasy (2016), Shiva
- Valkyria Chronicles 4 (2018), Belgar
- Fire Emblem Heroes (2017), Arvis
- Tales of the Rays (2017), Garr Kelvin
- Super Robot Wars X (2018), Gengo Kuramitsu
- Super Robot Wars T (2019), Rabaan Zaramand
- Code Vein (2019), Juzo Mido
- Jump Force (2019), Sousuke Aizen
- Arknights (2019), Hellagur
- Sakura Wars (2019), Tekkan Amamiya
- Yakuza: Like a Dragon (2020), Reiji Ishioda
- Space Channel 5 VR: Kinda Funky New Flash! (2020), Jaguar
- Fairy Tail (2020), Ichiya Wanderlei Kotobuki
- ALTDEUS: Beyond Chronos (2020), Deiter
- A Certain Magical Index: Imaginary Fest (2021), Nōkan Kihara
- JoJo's Bizarre Adventure: All Star Battle R (2022), Vanilla Ice
- Cardfight!! Vanguard Dear Days (2022), Kanji Meguro
- Rusty Rabbit (2025), Nether
- The First Berserker: Khazan (2025), Blade Phantom
- Zenless Zone Zero (2025), Banyue
- Arknights: Endfield (2026), Pogranichnik
- Dark Auction (2026), Auctioneer

Unknown date

- Another Century's Episode series, Maximillian Jenius, Kei Katsuragi
- Ar tonelico II, Shun
- Brave Story: New Traveler, Leynart
- BS Tantei Club: Yuki ni Kieta Kako, Shunsuke Utsugi
- League of Legends, Jhin, Vel'Koz
- Muramasa: The Demon Blade, Yukinojyo Yagyu
- Odin Sphere, Melvin
- Ray Tracers, Tsumiji
- Megadimension Neptunia VII, Umio
- Super Robot Wars series, Maximillian Jenius, Burn Burnings, Gavlet Gable, Klein Sandman, Kei Katsuragi, Ginias Saharin
- Dragalia Lost, Aurien, Heinwald, Nyalarthotep

=== Drama CD ===
- 07-Ghost (xxxx), Ayanami
- Shinakoi (xxxx), Ango Inoguchi
- Ai no Kusabi series 2: Dark Erogenous (xxxx), Raoul
- Angel Sanctuary (xxxx), Uriel
- Fate/Zero (xxxx), Tohsaka Tokiomi
- JoJo's Bizarre Adventure Drama CD Book (xxxx), Noriaki Kakyoin
- Stanley Hawk no Jikenbo: Ambivalence . Katto (xxxx), Arista
- Yami no Matsuei series 1 (xxxx), Kazutaka Muraki
- Yami no Matsuei series 2: Summer Vacation (xxxx), Kazutaka Muraki
- From Far Away CD Drama (1999): Rachef
- Hypnosis Mic: Division Rap Battle "Matenro (On'in Rinjo)" (麻天狼-音韻臨床-) (2017), Jakurai Jinguji (ill-DOC)
- Hypnosis Mic: Division Rap Battle "Fling Posse vs. Matenro" (2018), Jakurai Jinguji (ill-DOC)
- Hypnosis Mic: Division Rap Battle "Mad Trigger Crew vs. Matenro" (2018), Jakurai Jinguji (ill-DOC)
- Hypnosis Mic: Division Rap Battle "The Champion" (2019), Jakurai Jinguji (ill-DOC)
- Hypnosis Mic: Division Rap Battle "Enter the Hypnosis Microphone" (2019), Jakurai Jinguji (ill-DOC)

== Dubbing ==
=== Live-action ===
- Andromeda, Dylan Hunt (Kevin Sorbo)
- The Cotton Club, Dixie Dwyer (Richard Gere)
- Debris, Craig Maddox (Norbert Leo Butz)
- Escape Plan: The Extractors, Shen Lo (Max Zhang)
- Good Sam, Dr. Rob Griffith (Jason Isaacs)
- Hawkeye, Jack Duquesne (Tony Dalton)
- Melrose Place, Michael Mancini (Thomas Calabro)
- Near Dark, Caleb Colton (Adrian Pasdar)
- Outlander, Frank/Jonathan Randall (Tobias Menzies)
- Safe House, Tom Broom (Stephen Moyer)
- A Series of Unfortunate Events, Lemony Snicket (Patrick Warburton)
- Suspiria (1986 TV Tokyo edition), Daniel (Flavio Bucci)
- The Theory of Flight, Gigolo (Ray Stevenson)

=== Animation ===
- Chuggington, Jackman
- Minions: The Rise of Gru, Svengeance
- Trolls World Tour, Growley Pete

=== Video games ===
- Spider-Man 2, Mysterio

== Discography ==
=== Albums ===
- Yuuga na Jōken (優雅な条件) (1992)
- Liaison (1994)
- Ordovices (1997)
- Garnitures (2000)
- Ren-Sa: Chaine (2001)
- Love Balance (2002)
- Idee: Ima, Boku ga Omou Koto (2003)
- Subete wa Boku kara Hajimatta (2005)
- Love Story (2007)

=== Singles ===
- Eien No Okusoku (1997)
- Shadow Maker (1997)
- Cactus (1997)

=== Talking albums ===
- Kotoba no Kuukan I (2000)
- Kotoba no Kuukan II (2001)
- Kotoba no Kuukan III (2002)
- Kotoba no Kuukan IV (2007)

=== Pure voice albums ===
- Voice: Dakara Anata ni (2008)
