= Gal-sen =

Japanese manga series

- First tankōbon volume cover

ギャルせん (Gyaru sen)
- Genre: Erotic comedy
- Manga
- Written by: Meguru Ueno
- Published by: Kodansha
- Imprint: Young Magazine KC
- Magazine: Weekly Young Magazine (2021–2022); YanMaga Web (2022–2023)
- Original run: September 13, 2021 – October 30, 2023
- Volumes: 9
- icon

Gal-sen (Japanese: ギャルせん, Hepburn: Gyaru sen) is a Japanese manga series written and illustrated by Meguru Ueno. It started in Kodansha's seinen manga magazine Weekly Young Magazine in September 2021. It finished in the magazine in September 2022; it was transferred to the YanMaga Web website and app in that same month, and finished in October 2023. Its chapters were collected in nine tankōbon volumes.

== Premise ==
Sora Nezu is shocked to find that his childhood neighbor and crush Suzune Nekogami has become a sexy, tanned gal teacher at his high school. While she is serious and strict with him during class time, she flirts with and gets him aroused outside of the classroom. His female classmates and teachers also show erotic interest in him.

== Characters ==
Sora Nezu (根津 宙, Nezu Sora)
As a child, Sora used to be taken care by his neighbor and crush "Suzu-nee" when he was young. When she was bathing with him, Sora became scared and confused by an erection and yelled that he hated Suzune to keep her from seeing. Now in his first year at high school, he tries to reconcile their relationship, but when she behaves erotically around him again, he gets aroused more and cannot stop thinking of her.
More than anything Sora wants to win Suzune's heart as he cannot image a life without her.
Suzune Nekogami (猫嚙 すずね, Nekogami Suzune)
Sora's former neighbor, she used to have a friendly and proper appearance when she babysat and played with him until she was rejected by him for inadvertently sexually arousing him. In high school, she pursues a gal lifestyle and bleaches her hair blonde with ganguro (dark skin) complexion. She returns as Sora's physical education / health teacher, and the advisor of their biology club. Outside of class, she teases him with increasingly erotic activities short of intercourse, wanting him to admit his perversion, being fully aware Sora cares for her.
Samejima and Kamoi
Sora's guy classmates, they form a biology club with Sora and Maina, with Suzune as their advisor.
Maina Uzuki
A beautiful high school gal who also has a social media following. Because all the school boys fawn over her except for Sora, she shows interest towards him and joins the biology club. But when he accidentally falls on her in an awkward "lucky pervert" manner, she then becomes aroused whenever she thinks of him, and acts upon that when alone, intoxicated, or in close contact with Sora. She is jealous of Sora's relationship with Suzune.
Mamiko Hitsuji
The school nurse and Suzu's former schoolmate. She likes to experiment with different fragrance oils and uses Sora as a boy toy. Some of the chapter titles refer to her as Mama-sensei because of her airhead-like motherly demeanor, glasses that she cannot see without, clumsiness and voluptuous chest. She used to be a delinquent gal in high school.
Aoi Althea Blancheval
Althea-sensei is an English teacher and advisor for their English & Social Studies (ESS) club. She started at the same year as Suzune and views her as a rival. Her first interactions with Sora was also inadvertently erotic.
Tsukasa Saginomiya
Tsukasa is introduced as a school prince who represents the ESS club in fighting against Sora at the school festival. However during the match, when Sora accidentally tears open Tsukasa's jacket and realizes that Tsukasa is a girl who has bound her breasts, he protects Tsukasa from having that known. Per her family tradition, Tsukasa is required to dress as a man until she comes of age or falls in love. She falls for Sora and wants to be his girlfriend.

== Publication ==
Written and illustrated by Meguru Ueno, Gal-sen started in Kodansha's seinen manga magazine Weekly Young Magazine on September 13, 2021. It finished in the magazine on September 12, 2022, and moved to the YanMaga Web website and app on September 26 of that same year. It finished on October 30, 2023. Kodansha collected its chapters in nine tankōbon volumes, released from February 4, 2022, to February 6, 2024.

=== Volumes ===
No.	Release date	ISBN
1	February 4, 2022	978-4-06-526837-7
2	May 6, 2022	978-4-06-527786-7
3	August 5, 2022	978-4-06-528808-5
4	November 4, 2022	978-4-06-529806-0
5	February 6, 2023	978-4-06-530706-9
6	May 8, 2023	978-4-06-531725-9
7	August 4, 2023	978-4-06-532652-7
8	November 6, 2023	978-4-06-533633-5
9	February 6, 2024	978-4-06-534620-4

== See also ==
- My First Girlfriend Is a Gal, another manga series by the same author
- Does a Hot Elf Live Next Door to You?, another manga series by the same author
