= List of Descendants of Darkness characters =

The following is a list of characters from the fantasy manga series Descendants of Darkness.

== Main characters ==
=== Asato Tsuzuki ===
Asato Tsuzuki (都筑 麻斗, Tsuzuki Asato), voiced by Dan Green (English), and Shinichiro Miki (Japanese), is the main protagonist of the story. He was born in 1900, and was 26 years old when he died and became a Shinigami. He is 97 at the beginning of the first book and the oldest employee of the Shokan/Summons division besides Chief Konoe, and the lowest-paid, due to his perceived incompetence. He is notorious among his fellow Shinigami for his slacker qualities and voracious appetite for sweets such as cinnamon buns and cakes. His favorite color is light green, and he has a flower garden (in which he is known to have tulips and hydrangeas).
It is revealed starting from the Last Waltz story line that he had a sister named Ruka who taught him how to dance, garden, and cook, though his skills in the latter are lacking. Her involvement in his past is left unclear.
Throughout the series, Tsuzuki develops an immediate closeness and affection to his current partner, Hisoka. He has a good friendship with Watari, and a sometimes strained relationship with Tatsumi, who had once been one of his partners. Tsuzuki gets along with most of the employees of Meifu, with the notable exceptions of Hakushaku, who constantly hits on him, and Terazuma, with whom he has a fierce rivalry. Tsuzuki's relationship with Muraki is very tumultuous; although Tsuzuki hates him for his cruelty towards other people, Tsuzuki's desire to sacrifice himself rather than hurt anyone else prevents him from outright killing Muraki.
Though he is easily one of the most cheerful members of the cast, he hides a dark secret from his past. Both manga and anime reference terrible deeds he committed in life. It is suggested that Tsuzuki murdered many people, whether intentionally or not; this is brought to Tsuzuki's attention during his demonic possession by Sargantanas, a powerful demon who appears in the Devil's Trill Arc. Doctor Muraki reveals to him from his grandfather's research that Tsuzuki was a patient of the elder Muraki and that Tsuzuki is, in fact, not quite human. During that time, he stayed alive without food, water, or sleep for eight years, and was incapable of dying from wounds, as shown by the many times he attempted suicide but survived. Muraki suggested that Tsuzuki may possess demon blood [shown by the fact that he has purple eyes], and Tsuzuki found this incredibly hard to deal with.
Tsuzuki wields the power of 12 Shikigami as well as o-fuda magic. He also has an incredibly high stamina, able to take massive damage to his body without being killed and healing almost immediately. Though this is later shown to be a trait for all Shinigami, he was the first one shown to have this ability, which appears to be tied to his pre-death abilities.

=== Hisoka Kurosaki ===
Hisoka Kurosaki (黒崎 密, Kurosaki Hisoka), voiced by Liam O'Brien (English), and Mayumi Asano (Japanese) is a 16-year-old Shinigami and Tsuzuki's current partner. He possesses strong empathy, which allows him to feel the emotions of others, read thoughts, see memories, and pick up imprints of clairvoyance off inanimate objects.
He came from a tradition-oriented family, and he was trained in traditional Japanese martial arts. His parents were afraid of his spiritual powers, which they considered unfit for their heir as well as something that could unfurl the familiar secret; so as a child he was often locked in a cellar when caught using his empathy.
When he was 13 years old he went out under the sakura trees near his home and stumbled across Muraki in the process of murdering an unknown woman. In order to keep him from exposing the crime, Muraki tortured Hisoka (the anime shows non-graphic rape) and cursed him to a slow death that gradually drained his life over three years. The curse is still active after his death, and visible in the form of red marks all over Hisoka's body, which reappear during encounters with Muraki, particularly in dreams. It is implied that they will disappear with Muraki's death, and only then will the curse be lifted. After Hisoka died, he became a shinigiami in order to discover the cause of his death since the doctor erased his memories of it.
Hisoka enjoys reading, and spends much of his time at the library by himself. His health even in the afterlife does not seem to be particularly well, and he has a tendency to faint. His lack of training and strength in comparison to Tsuzuki is also painfully apparent to him. However, he is a capable detective, and clever in subterfuge. It's also revealed that Hisoka has a fear of the dark.
Although extremely reserved to the point of coldness, Hisoka deeply cares for other people. When Tsuzuki regains his suicidal tendencies, Hisoka comforts him and ends up preventing him from killing himself once again. Hisoka also has a strong urge to take care of Tsuzuki, even though Tsuzuki drives him crazy sometimes. He maintains comfortable relationships with the rest of his co-workers, with the noticeable exception of Saya and Yuma, who constantly try to play with him like a doll.
Besides his empathy, Hisoka has also been trained in basic ofuda and defensive magic by Chief Konoe. Later in the series, he goes to seek out a Shikigami for himself in order to increase his power. Hisoka's first Shikigami is a Spanish-speaking potted cactus named Riko, a defensive and water-type Shiki. Hisoka is also adept in traditional martial arts, particularly archery, and kendo. His favorite color is blue, his favorite hobby is reading and his motto is "save money".

=== Kazutaka Muraki ===
Kazutaka Muraki (邑輝 一貴, Muraki Kazutaka), voiced by Edward MacLeod in English, and by Show Hayami in Japanese, is the primary antagonist in Yami no Matsuei. His angelic appearance and characteristics serve to contrast with his brutal nature.
Muraki's psychological troubles appear to have begun in childhood with his mother and his half-brother Saki. Muraki's mother collected dolls, and she is shown as treating him as though he were a doll as well. Muraki's love of dolls and his collecting of dolls is a motif throughout the manga and anime, paralleling what he does with real people. In the anime, it is suggested that Saki killed Muraki's parents when they were still children (in the Kyoto arc, Muraki has a flashback of his mother's funeral and sees Saki smirking during the procession) and later tried to kill him in a craze. However, in the manga, it is not clear what Saki's role was other than disrupting Muraki's childhood, and Muraki describes himself as his mother's killer. Whatever the circumstances, Saki was shot by one of the family's guards, and Muraki became obsessed with bringing back Saki in order to kill him himself. Thus, Muraki learned of Tsuzuki while researching his grandfather's notes, becoming obsessed with Tsuzuki's body; both carnally and scientifically. In the manga it is clear what Muraki desires, but the anime had to censor such extremes, and so Muraki's advances toward Tsuzuki were shown as hints of sexual harassment.
Throughout the story, Muraki manipulates souls of the dead, often killing the people himself, in hopes of drawing the attention of the Shinigami, in particular, Tsuzuki.
Muraki is an expert manipulator, fronting as a good doctor who laments over his inability to save lives, while hiding his private life as a serial killer. As a respected physician, Muraki has many connections throughout Japan among powerful patrons, but in the anime and manga, he is mostly seen in the company of his close friend Oriya and his old teacher, Professor Satomi. Muraki also has a childhood sweetheart by the name of Ukyou, but very little is known about her, other than that she appears to draw evil spirits to her and that her health is poor. During the Kyoto Arc, Muraki discredits his good persona, contrasting himself to Professor Satomi before silencing him. Being a serial killer, Muraki has numerous victims, the most significant of which is Hisoka Kurosaki, whom he raped before placing a curse on him that wiped Hisoka's memory of the event and eventually killed him in the form of a terminal illness. Later, when Hisoka is a shinigami, Muraki forces the boy to recall the night that he cursed him. Throughout both the anime and manga, it's shown that Muraki often refers to Hisoka as a doll.
Some readers believed that because of his different colored eyes, he may be a guardian of one of the four gates of GenSouKai (see Wakaba Kannuki). However, in the King of Swords arc (volume three in the manga), a scene where Tsuzuki knocks out the fake eye reveals that Muraki's right eye is not real and that it is mechanical. The origin and nature of Muraki's supernatural abilities remain an enigma: he is human (with certain vampiric traits, such as feeding off peoples' life energy [it is theorized that he is an energy vampire]), he is alive (not a Shinigami), yet he raises a dead girl to be a zombie, seals and opens Hisoka's memory by mere touch, controls creature spirits similar to Shikigami, enters Meifu by himself and teleports Tsuzuki to another location. In the finale, Muraki refers to himself as a Descendant of Darkness like Tsuzuki. It is hinted that Muraki is bisexual which shown quite often in the series when he also made some sexual advances towards Tsuzuki even to a point where he almost tries to kiss him.

=== Supporting Shinigami and supernatural characters ===
==== Chief Konoe ====
Konoe is the boss of the Shokan Division of EnmaCho, and is Tsuzuki's superior. He has known Tsuzuki for all of the latter's career, and is one of the few characters who knows Tsuzuki's mysterious past before he became a shinigami. Konoe uses his influence to protect Tsuzuki from other higher-ups in Meifu. Konoe is an older man who is often gruff with his employees. He is known for having a sweet tooth and according to an author's note in volume 2 is a black belt in an unknown martial art. He is voiced by Chunky Mon in English, and Tomomichi Nishimura in Japanese.

==== Seiichiro Tatsumi ====
Seiichiro Tatsumi (巽 征一郎, Tatsumi Sei'ichirō), voiced by Walter Pagen in English, and Toshiyuki Morikawa in Japanese, is the secretary of the Shokan division. In addition to this position, which allows him control over department finances and thus substantial influence over Chief Konoe, he is seen to partner with Watari when working on a case. He also assists Tsuzuki and Hisoka on multiple cases.
In volume 5 of the manga, it is revealed that Tatsumi was Tsuzuki's third partner. This only lasted for three months until Tatsumi quit, unable to handle Tsuzuki's emotional breakdowns which paralleled those of his mother, a well-born woman whose death he blames himself for. His relationship with Tsuzuki, though partially resolved in volume 5, remains uncertain and often underlaced by guilt (on Tatsumi's part) over their past partnership and protectiveness. However, petty conflicts often arise over issues with department finances, most particularly in the cost of rebuilding the library after Tsuzuki destroys it (twice).
In addition to the standard abilities of shinigami, he also has the ability to manipulate shadows both as weapons and as a means of transport.

==== Yutaka Watari ====
Yutaka Watari (亘理 温, Watari Yutaka), voiced by Eric Stuart in English, and Toshihiko Seki in Japanese, is 24 years old and a close friend of Tsuzuki's who works for the sixth sector, Henjoucho (which includes Osaka and Kyoto). Nevertheless, he is most often seen in the lab and he is accompanied by Tatsumi when he works in the field. Though technically a mechanical engineer (he has a PhD in engineering), he is basically a scientist who invents whatever comes to mind, most often a gender change potion. He is also in charge of computer maintenance & repair. Though sharing a cheery demeanor similar to Tsuzuki's, whenever something befalls one of his friends he becomes very and suddenly angry.
One of his near-constant companions is an owlet named "003" (001 is a toucan and 002 is a penguin, they stay in Watari's lab). Watari's dream is to create a gender change potion, his self-declared motives being to understand women. He often experimentally tests his creations on both himself and on Tsuzuki, relying on the latter's fondness for sweets to ensure his cooperation. Aside from his apparent familiarity in the laboratory, Watari also has the ability to bring his drawings to life despite the fact that he is a poor artist. According to the author, his hair was bleached blonde by excessive chlorine in a swimming pool.
Late volumes of the manga reveal his past employment with the Five Generals, who were involved in the Mother Project, the supercomputer of Meifu.

==== Saya Torii and Yuma Fukiya ====
As the acting Shinigami for Hokkaidō, the Ninth District, Saya and Yuma are often snowed in, thus limiting their interaction with the rest of the cast. They are bubbly, very affectionate girls, often throwing themselves at Tsuzuki and Hisoka in overly enthusiastic embraces, though they hold a particular fondness for Hisoka and his attractive, feminine appearance. However, they are sincere in their wanting everyone to be good friends.
Both have the same light-brown hair and petite form; Saya is generally seen as the quieter of the two, although she has her moments of manic energy like her partner Yuma.

==== Hajime Terazuma ====
Terazuma is not mentioned in the anime version (though he is seen briefly in the opening, the first episode, and the last). However, in the manga, he serves as Tsuzuki's rival. He is first introduced in volume 4 of the manga, and states that he is from the EnMaCho ShoKan Division, and is the junior partner of the fourth district Chūgoku. Terazuma was a policeman from Hiroshima in life, which gave him a rough and pessimistic demeanor, as well as a strong sense of duty. He has a parasitic Shikigami (Kagan Kuroshuki), which altered elements of his face to appear more feral. Though he can transform at will into his Shikigami, when touched by a female or exposed to water Terazuma involuntarily becomes a raging beast. In volume four of the manga, he had an embarrassing experience of transforming after touching Hisoka, which causes him humiliation whenever brought up by other characters.
Terazuma and Tsuzuki fight frequently, mostly because Terazuma hates the fact Tsuzuki controls 12 Shikigami, when he was forced to get his own Shikigami and cannot control it, and because he thinks Tsuzuki might steal Wakaba away from him. The rivalry between Tsuzuki and Terazuma has gone far enough to destroy the newly built library in Meifu, of which the damage costs were taken out of both their paychecks.

==== Wakaba Kannuki ====
Wakaba appears only twice briefly in the anime including the opening, and not particularly often in the manga. She first appears in volume 4 in the manga and is revealed as Terazuma's partner. Wakaba is a miko or priestess of sorts; a job that ran in her family. As such, she has strong spiritual powers, which she uses to return Terazuma to his human form on the frequent occasions where he is provoked into transforming. She is also often the cause of these changes thanks to the possibly mutual crush they share, though Terazuma's condition has significantly limited this. She is also the guardian of one of the four gates into Gensoukai, the south or Suzaku Gate. This role is the cause of her heterochromia. She's also a high school student when she's not working at the agency or with her partner.

==== Gushoshin ====
The Gushoshin are based upon twin mythological Japanese figures who dwell in the underworld and record the deeds of human lives in preparation for final judgment. One is known to record the good deeds; the other, the bad deeds. In Yami no Matsuei-(both in the manga and anime series), they are depicted as small, bird-like creatures that talk. They work in the library, protect its contents which include a database of deaths, and often provide research support to the main characters. They also serve as comic reliefs within the franchise.

==== Hakushaku ====
The Hakushaku is variously translated as 'Count' or 'Earl.' He has no other given name. He is the keeper of the Castle of Candles, a great manor filled with candles whose flames represent every human life. He is invisible when he wants to be (as we see part of him in human form in book 9), using a mask and gloves so people can tell where he is when he's not wearing one of his costumes. His main duty is snuffing out the candles and recording the deceased, but he seems to spend much of his free time entertaining or looking at pictures of Tsuzuki, with whom he is obsessed with and cares deeply about. The Hakushaku has done favors of extending the lives of several people for Tsuzuki over the years, and this debt makes Tsuzuki very nervous, on account of the nature of the favors he may have to return. The Hakushaku features most prominently in the manga, in which readers learn he has a book that writes stories using characters based on the rest of the Yami no Matsuei cast. In the book, Tsuzuki's feminine form [whom Tsuzuki meets and calls "Ruka" after his sister] is to be wed to the Hakushaku's character (though in the end she falls in love with Butler, the book version of Tatsumi, representing the past relationship between Tsuzuki and Tatsumi). The Hakushaku also hosts many parties in the manga, ranging from a cherry blossom viewing party to more formal evening balls. Hakushaku's main servant is a zombie-like creature in a pink apron, named "Watson".

==== Enma-Daioh ====
The Great King Enma is the ruler of Meifu. In Yami no Matsuei, the Shokan/Summons division reports directly to him. Though obviously powerful, he is a mysterious character about which little is known. He has a particular interest in the work of shinigami Tsuzuki. Enma seems intent on Tsuzuki remaining in his afterlife, but the true motivations behind his attitude towards him have yet to be revealed. Absent from the anime, Enma-Daioh is rarely seen in the manga, but appears to have a dragon-like form in the second manga. In the later chapters of the Kamakura/GenSouKai Arcs, it is shown that Enma-Daioh has a human form. He is a mysterious character with long black hair whose eyes are never shown, adding to the mystery of his character.

=== Supporting human characters ===
Hijiri Minase
A brilliant teenage violinist who is the star pupil and a possible genius in his music school, he appears in the "Devil's Trill arc". His appearance is based on one of the original designs for Hisoka, resulting in the pair being nearly identical. An incident involving his accidental contract with a demon (due to a cornea transplant) forces the shinigami to step in the Devil's Trill arc.
He is voiced by Jack Lingo in English and Minami Takayama in Japanese.
Kazusa Otonashi
Kazusa Otonashi is a young little girl whom Hijiri befriends in the Devil's Trill arc and lives at a local orphanage. Her father was a violinist before he died and his corneas were donated to Hijiri. Kazusa gives Hijiri her father's violin after he loses his own, unaware that it is possessed by a demon. Kazusa begins avoiding Hijiri later, but it turns out that she had seen the demon hiding in the violin. Her father, as it turns out had sold her life to the devil in exchange for becoming a famous violinist. The devil knew that, through Hijiri's cornea Kazusa's father is still alive and so he tries to kill Hijiri and take Kazusa.
Despite efforts to protect Kazusa, she ultimately dies when she pushes Hijiri away from falling debris caused by the demon's battle with Byakko and Suzaku, getting crushed by a collapsing pillar in the process. In the manga, she is a shinigami after she dies but in the anime this is never stated, causing some confusion when she is seen, alive and well, with Tsuzuki and Hisoka at the end of the arc. She makes no further appearances afterward.
She is voiced by Tomoko Kawakami in Japanese and Beth McGowan in English.
Tsubaki Kakyouin
A very frail girl nicknamed "Tsubaki-hime" (Princess Tsubaki) in the anime, but nicknamed Camille in the manga (after the prostitute in the novel The Lady of the Camellias by Alexandre Dumas, fils), and daughter of a millionaire. She appears in the "King of Swords arc". She was born with a heart defect that Muraki corrected with a transplant during her childhood; after learning this, Tsubaki acquired a crush on Muraki, not knowing that the heart she received was the one of her old friend Eileen, a flower girl who kept her company and whom Muraki killed (along with other people who were involved in human organs traffic) in order to harvest her heart for Tsubaki.
Not long after this surgery, Muraki told her where her heart had come from and proceeded to manipulate her newly found knowledge into an alternate personality who, calling herself Eileen and claiming to be the flower girl's spirit, murdered the other passengers aboard the Queen Camelia for revenge. Tsubaki appears to have been minimally aware of this and attempts to fall for Hisoka in order to detach herself from the doctor. This fails, and so Hisoka goes through with her request to kill her. In the end, he is shown very deeply disturbed after the cruise liner sinks, showing he might have harbored feelings for her as well.
She is voiced by Tara Jayne in English, and Machiko Toyashima and Kumi Sakuma in Japanese, the former playing Tsubaki, and the other playing Eileen.
Oriya Mibu
Very little is known about Oriya. He owns Kou Kaku Rou, an elegant traditional restaurant that is secretly a brothel for the rich and powerful. He inherited this from his family, who held Kou Kaku Rou for many generations (it is described in the manga as one of the oldest, if not the oldest restaurant in Kyoto). He is a friend of Muraki's from college, and Muraki's only known friend. He wears a very distinctive and ornate kimono and is often seen smoking a traditional Japanese kiseru pipe; he practices kendo and is an expert with the katana. He has very strong, somewhat ambiguous feelings toward Muraki. In the most recent continuation of the series, he is shown to be hosting and caring for Ukyou, Muraki's childhood sweetheart.
Though he is usually seen as a neutral or sympathetic figure in the story, he is also an active collaborator of Muraki's. He has helped Muraki cover up his murders through his network of high-ranking officials, and in return, Muraki has disposed of troublesome elements among the women of his brothel.
He is voiced by Kazuhiko Inoue in Japanese and Jack Lingo in the English.
Saki Shidou
Muraki's older, half-brother. They are nearly the same age and look very similar, though Saki has blond-brown hair. Saki was the result of his father's philandering with one of his patients. At about the age of 16, Saki was brought to live with Muraki in their household. Muraki credits this as having ruined his life by destroying his family. In the anime, Saki is directly responsible for the deaths of Muraki's parents, though in the manga Muraki says he killed his own mother.
Ukyou Sakuraiji
Muraki's fiancée and Oriya's friend, who works for Sakura Pharmaceuticals. She has the appearance of a high-school girl, despite being in her thirties. She is two years younger than Muraki and Oriya, and went to school with them. After Muraki's disappearance following the events in Kyoto, Ukyou began visiting Oriya every year in his place. She seems to be a relatively good person with rather poor health.
Hisae Tojyo
Hisae Tojyo is a nineteen-year-old dancer who has a small part in the first story from the second book, though she does not appear in the anime series. Her mother died when she was very young; following the event, she and her brother raised themselves. Later in her life she grew very ill from an unspecified disease, and on the way to visit her at the hospital, her brother died in a car accident; as such, she blames herself for his death. Afterward she checked out of the hospital despite her failing health in order to carry out her and her brother's dream to make their dance academy successful. However, her name was on the Kiseki, and a few months later Tsuzuki shows up to deliver the summons and ultimately becomes involved. She has also been in love with Tsuzuki later in the short story but died.
Hisae is often found wearing dresses, has dark hair, and is much notably shorter than Tsuzuki. She can have a temper, and jumps to conclusions most of the time without waiting for further explanation.
Nagare Kurosaki
Nagare Kurosaki is Hisoka's father, and appears only later in the manga series, though never in the anime. Strict and traditional, he will seem to do anything to keep his family's secret under control. He appears ill to Watari and Tatsumi, but his poor physical condition is probably due to the swamp god Yatonokami possessing him. It is also noted that Hisoka gets much of his looks from his father, and they do, indeed, appear almost identical in hair and eye colour.

=== The Shikigami ===
The shikigami in Yami no Matsuei are guardian spirits; creatures which can be summoned by shinigami. When in battle in the living world, shikigami appear as various types of mythological creatures. There are different kinds of shikigami, roughly divided by the four elements, earth, wind, fire, and water. The majority of shinigami can only summon two or three shikigami. The single exception is Asato Tsuzuki, who commands the power of twelve high-ranked shikigami. They include the following:

- Byakko: a white tiger

The guardian of the West. As a human (though complete with a striped tail), Byakko is similar to Tsuzuki in his habit of skipping work to have a nap, and being very lively and exuberant.

- Suzaku: a red "firebird" or phoenix, the first we see in the anime. She is the guardian of the South.

In GensouKai, Suzaku is a dark-haired, fierce-tempered woman. Since Kyoto, she has born a grudge against her fellow fire-type Touda for the part he played in assisting Tsuzuki in his latest attempt of suicide. She is devoted to Tsuzuki, as shown by her misguided attempt to protect him in Kyoto. She also loves to drink and eat just like Tsuzuki, who affectionately calls her "Nee-san".

- Souryuu: a blue dragon, the representative of the Emperor of GensouKai (see below)

The guardian of the East. Souryuu is one of the strongest and most highly ranked of the Shikigami, other than Kurikara. He is suspicious of newcomers to his realm, and perceives Hisoka as a threat to its stability to the point of attacking him. Despite once being close to Kurikara, after the civil war he used the power granted to him by the Golden Emperor in order to seal Kurikara away. He has two children: Koujin and Tenko, thunder and water shikigami respectively who also serve Tsuzuki.

- Genbu: the black tortoise/snake, the guardian of the North.

Genbu appears in human form as a tiny old man who is generally held in contempt by servants for his strange behavior. Nevertheless, he has on occasion offered advice to both Tsuzuki and Hisoka.

- Kouchin: A court musician who spends her time flirting and playing music, though she displays some knowledge of the civil war in Gensoukai.
- Rikujo: An astrologer shikigami and Genbu's student with several pairs of eyes on his hands and face. He appears to have a confrontational relationship with Souryuu.
- Taimo: A spellbreaker with a completely blank face who occasionally offers advice to Tsuzuki.
- Tenko: The daughter of Souryuu, and Kijin's younger sister. She is a water shiki.
- Kijin: The son of Souryuu, and Tenko's older brother. He is a thunder shiki.
- Daion: A gag shikigami who lives in a pot that has a mouth and eyes cut into it.
- Tenku: A large shrine that the others dwell in who also served as Touda's prison prior to Tsuzuki's arrival. He is shown to bear a grudge towards the former.
- Touda: a huge, black, winged serpent. The only shikigami capable of destroying a shinigami.

When in human form, Touda wears a visor over his eyes to inhibit his powers. He does as Tsuzuki asks, but only exactly as he asks. Nonetheless, he is devoted in his own way to Tsuzuki, who freed him from eternal imprisonment within Tenku for unknown crimes. It is suggested that his crimes were actually missions the Golden Emperor assigned him privately, then punished him for publicly. He vowed to help Tsuzuki since it was the only way out of his imprisonment and agreed to wear the visor that also seems to alter his memories as well as limit his strength.

- Kurikara: a fire dragon type. Thought to be the most powerful shikigami in all of Gensoukai.

In his human form he a very short male with the typical long ears of the dragon types and a scar that runs down the center of his forehead, and a second one that runs over his right eye from wounds that Souryuu inflicted on him. He and Souryuu used to be very close friends until after the civil war when the latter sealed him away. It is later revealed that he chose to defend humans against the Golden Emperor during the war, though he tells Hisoka that he hates them. The latter is currently attempting to gain him as one of his own shikigami. It is thought that Kurikara is a large black steel dragon.

There are two other characters who have shikigami: Hisoka Kurosaki and Hajime Terazuma.

-Hisoka is in control of a small, first level water Shiki named Riko. He can contain water in his body and spray it at will, and enjoys singing into a microphone and speaking bits of Spanish and English. He died protecting Hisoka from an enraged Kurikara. Hisoka then tried to attack Kurikara, but was stopped by Kotaro.

-Terazuma carries the only known example of a parasitic type of shikigami, KaGanKokuShunGei. It roughly translates to 'Red-Eyed Black Lion'. When he is touched by a girl or a boy who looks girly (Hisoka), he transforms into a raging black beast that breathes fire. The beast is only contained by Wakaba's quick action slapping sealing fudas on its forehead, and she has admitted that she can only seal 'Kuro-chan'two times in a row per day. Because of Terazuma's practical non-existence in the anime, its form is never seen on screen. Tsuzuki stated that a bad match between a parasitic type and its host results in markings and other irregular deformities of the face, eyes, or teeth. This leads one to presume that Terazuma is a prime example of a 'bad match'.

==== GensouKai ====
The later manga volumes explain how the shikigami live an independent existence in a dimension separate from but connected to Meifu. This "imaginary world", GensouKai, is populated by many shikigamis. Like the Meifu, GensouKai appears to be an individual realm and society in its own right. The shikigamis inhabit the world in their human forms (avatars). When he visits, this causes much confusion for Hisoka, who searches for a "tiger, or a red bird", ignorant of the fact that the shikigamis in their own world do, in most cases, resemble humans.

GensouKai is allegedly ruled over by an Emperor. However, the "Golden Emperor" as he is known, has not been seen for many years. It is thought by some that he died. The Emperor's representative is Souryuu, the Protector of the East.
