= Does a Hot Elf Live Next Door to You? =

Japanese manga series

- First tankōbon volume cover

おたくの隣りはエルフですか？ (Otaku no Tonari wa Erufu desu ka?)
- Genre: Fantasy; Harem; Romantic comedy
- Manga
- Written by: Meguru Ueno
- Published by: Kodansha
- English publisher: NA: Seven Seas Entertainment
- Magazine: Weekly Young Magazine
- Original run: July 13, 2019 – March 22, 2021
- Volumes: 5
- icon

Does a Hot Elf Live Next Door to You? (Japanese: おたくの隣りはエルフですか？, Hepburn: Otaku no Tonari wa Erufu desu ka?) is a Japanese manga series written and illustrated by Meguru Ueno. It was serialized in Kodansha's seinen manga magazine Weekly Young Magazine from July 2019 to March 2021, with its chapters collected in five tankōbon volumes. It is licensed in North America for English release by Seven Seas Entertainment.

== Plot ==
In 202X, Japan experiences frequent interactions with beings from other worlds. Inudou Keita, a high school student and aspiring manga artist, lives alone while honing his craft. His routine is disrupted when Surt, a temperamental high elf, moves in next door. Their initial clashes over his depictions of elves gradually give way to an uneasy coexistence.

Keita's life grows increasingly chaotic as supernatural figures intrude upon it. His landlady Lilith hides mysterious origins, while the goddess Ameno Uzume enlists his help in restoring her temple through modern means. When Surt drags him to her homeland, he is forced into a fake engagement to satisfy her family. Meanwhile, he contends with advances from a demon, a delinquent goddess, and a classmate seeking romance.

As Keita struggles to balance these complications, his manga career stalls when his editor criticizes his lack of romantic experience—a pointed critique that contrasts starkly with the increasingly convoluted relationships he navigates. The situation escalates when Surt departs for an arranged marriage, forcing Keita to reconcile his feelings while adapting to a reality where mythological and modern worlds intertwine.

== Publication ==
Does a Hot Elf Live Next Door to You, written and illustrated by Meguru Ueno, was serialized in Kodansha's seinen manga magazine Weekly Young Magazine from July 13, 2019, to March 22, 2021. Kodansha collected its chapters in five tankōbon volumes, released from January 6, 2020, to June 4, 2021.

In North America, Seven Seas Entertainment announced the English release of the series in both print and digital format starting in August 2021.

=== Volumes ===
No.	Original release date	Original ISBN	English release date	English ISBN
1	January 6, 2020	978-4-06-518217-8	August 24, 2021	978-1-947804-97-5
2	June 5, 2020	978-4-06-519989-3	November 2, 2021	978-1-648274-99-2
3	October 6, 2020	978-4-06-520997-4	March 1, 2022	978-1-648275-11-1
4	February 5, 2021	978-4-06-522301-7	June 21, 2022	978-1-638582-50-2
5	June 4, 2021	978-4-06-523664-2	January 17, 2023	978-1-63858-676-0

== See also ==
- My First Girlfriend Is a Gal, another manga series by the same author
- Gal-sen, another manga series by the same author
