= Rei Igarashi =

Japanese actress and voice actress

- 五十嵐 麗
- Born: Takako Ōhama; 9 January 1963 (age 63); Fuchū, Tokyo, Japan
- Occupations: Actress; voice actress
- Years active: 1992–present
- Agent: Rush Style
- Spouse: Show Hayami (m. 1985)

Takako Ōhama (大濱 貴子, Ōhama Takako; born 9 January 1963), better known by the stage name Rei Igarashi (五十嵐 麗, Igarashi Rei), is a Japanese actress and voice actress who works for Rush Style. She is married to fellow voice actor Show Hayami, and is the mother of the Japanese voice actor Hideyuki Hayami.

== Filmography ==
=== Anime ===
- Brave of the Legend Da Garn (1992), Sakamoto Misuzu
- Macross 7 (1994), Zomd
- Urotsukidoji (1995), Mizuchi
- Bio Hunter (1995), Mary
- Serial Experiments Lain (1998), Miho Iwakura
- Record of Lodoss War: Chronicles of the Heroic Knight (1998), Karla
- Detective Conan (1998), Eri Nakamura (ep. 120)
- Tokimeki Memorial (1999), Mira Kagami
- Eden's Bowy (1999), Enefia
- Inuyasha (2000), Mistress Centipede
- PaRappa the Rapper (2001), Teacher Hippo
- Maou Dante (2002), Utsugi Tamiko
- Lupin III: The Big Operation to Return The Treasures (2003), Misha
- Magical Girl Lyrical Nanoha (2004), Precia Testarossa
- Saiyuki Reload and Reload Gunlock (2004), Kanzeon Bosatsu
- Cossette no Shozo (2004), Sakadou Zenshinni
- Amatsuki (2008), Imayou
- Cobra the Animation (2008), Linda Windsor
- Shangri-La (2009), Ryoko Naruse
- Eden of the East (2009), Kuroha Diana Shiratori (Selacao No. 11)
- Tropical-Rouge! Pretty Cure (2021), The Witch of Delays
- Eien no 831 (2022), Kyōko Kagami
- Bleach: Sennen Kessen-Hen (2022), Izumi Ishida
- Ron Kamonohashi's Forbidden Deductions 2nd Season (2024), Karen Lily
- Though I Am an Inept Villainess (2026), Kou Kenshū

=== Tokusatsu ===
- Genseishin Justirisers (2004), Dr. Zora

=== Video games ===
- Tokimeki Memorial (1994), Mira Kagami
- Maximo: Ghosts to Glory (2001), Queen, Aurora Lee
- Super Robot Wars Alpha 3 (2005), Vomd
- Rogue Galaxy (2005), Mother Rune
- Trauma Team (2010), Sandra Lieberman
- Final Fantasy VII Rebirth (2024), Rhonda

=== Dubbing ===
==== Live-action ====
- 2046 (Su Li-zhen (Gong Li))
- Antwone Fisher (Berta Davenport (Salli Richardson))
- Before Sunset (Journalist #1 (Louise Lemoine Torres))
- Belly of the Beast (Lulu (Monica Lo))
- Blade (2001 TV Tokyo edition) (Dr. Karen Jenson (N'Bushe Wright))
- The Bridge (Charlotte Millwright (Annabeth Gish))
- Counterpart (Emily Silk (Olivia Williams))
- Cronos (Mercedes Gris (Margarita Isabel))
- The Dark Knight Rises (Miranda Tate / Talia al Ghul (Marion Cotillard))
- Daybreakers (Audrey Bennett (Claudia Karvan))
- Fading Gigolo (Dr. Parker (Sharon Stone))
- The Fall Guy (Gail Meyer (Hannah Waddingham))
- Fatherhood (Marion (Alfre Woodard))
- Firewall (2009 TV Asahi edition) (Beth Stanfield (Virginia Madsen))
- Forsaken (Mary Alice Watson (Demi Moore))
- The Gift (Linda (Kim Dickens))
- Hannah Montana: The Movie (Vita (Vanessa Williams))
- The Hunger Games: The Ballad of Songbirds & Snakes (Dr. Volumnia Gaul (Viola Davis))
- Inception (Mal Cobb (Marion Cotillard))
- Keeping the Faith (Anna Reilly (Jenna Elfman))
- Lilo & Stitch (Mrs. Kekoa (Tia Carrere))
- The Midnight After (Mook Sau-ying (Kara Wai))
- Nurse Jackie (Eleanor O'Hara (Eve Best))
- The Royal Tenenbaums (Margot Helen Tenenbaum (Gwyneth Paltrow))
- The Sorcerer's Apprentice (Veronica Gorloisen (Monica Bellucci))
- Spectre (Lucia Sciarra (Monica Bellucci))
- Strike Back (Eleanor Grant (Amanda Mealing))
- Supernatural (Pamela Barnes (Traci Dinwiddie))
- Wasabi (Sofia (Carole Bouquet))

==== Animation ====
- Steven Universe (Rose Quartz)
