= Shinichi Ishihara =

- 石原 慎一
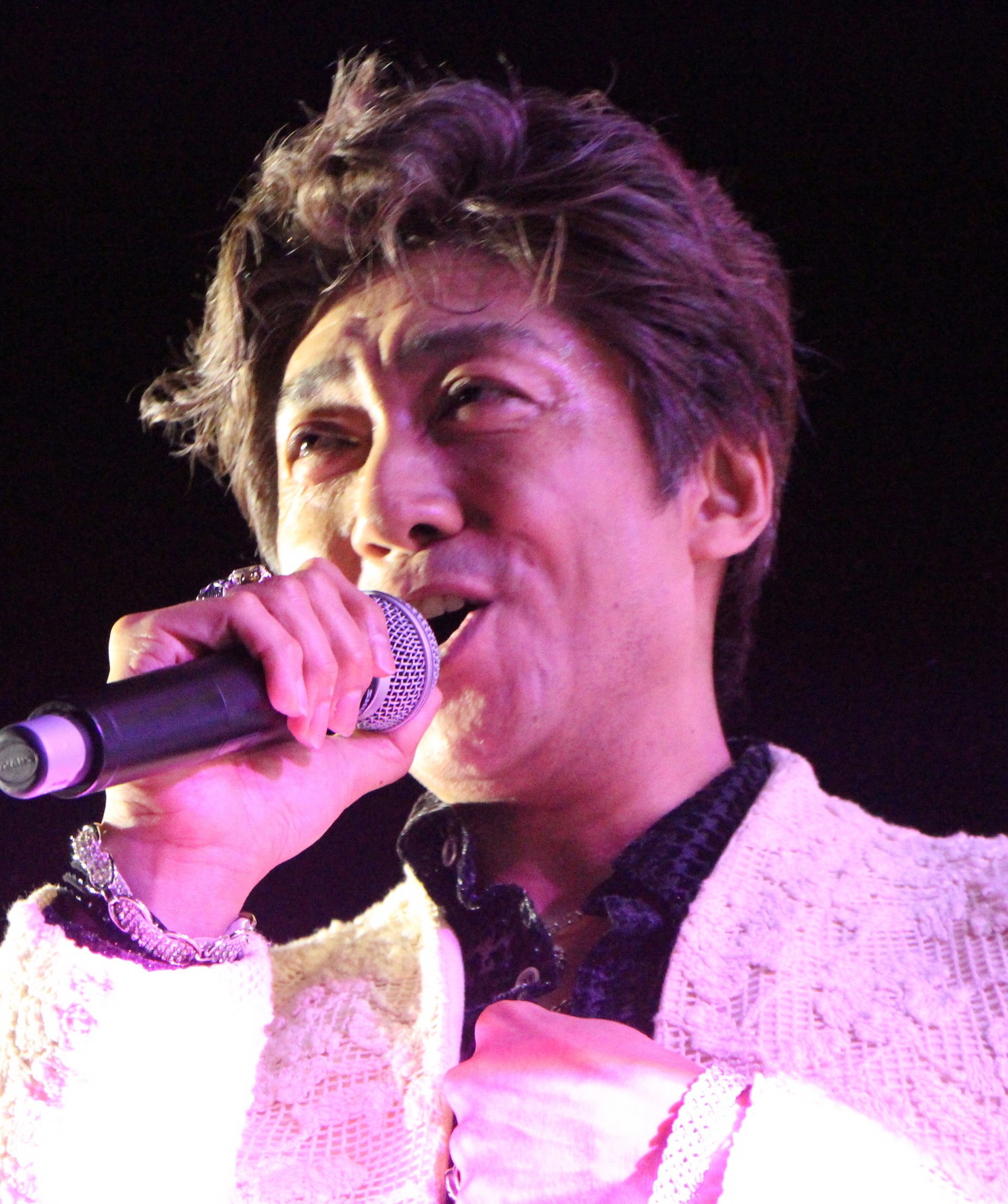
- Shinichi Ishihara at Anime Friends 2013.
- Born: May 26, 1960 (age 65); Yamanashi, Japan
- Occupation(s): Singer, voice actor, actor
- Years active: 1988–present
- Musical career
- Instrument: Singing
- Labels: Columbia Music Entertainment, Avex Mode

Shinichi Ishihara (石原 慎一, Ishihara Shin'ichi, born May 26, 1960) is a Japanese singer, voice actor and actor from Yamanashi Prefecture. He is famous for singing the theme songs of Guyver, Kamen Rider Agito and Kyuukyuu Sentai GoGo-V, among other theme songs as well as the entire soundtrack to Juukou B-Fighter.

== Filmography ==
=== Television animation ===
- Bikkuriman 2000 (1999) (Shikakukabin)

=== Original video animation (OVA) ===
- Babel II (1992) (Wang)

=== Dubbing ===
==== Live-action ====
- Mars Attacks! (Tom Jones)

==== Animation ====
- The Pebble and the Penguin (Hubie)
- Tangled (Big Nose Thug)
