= Minami Ozaki =

Japanese manga artist

- Born: February 27, 1968 (age 58) Kanagawa Prefecture, Japan
- Area: Manga artist
- Notable works: Zetsuai 1989

Minami Ozaki (尾崎南, Ozaki Minami) is a Japanese manga artist, cartoonist and illustrator of novels born on February 27, 1968, in Kanagawa Prefecture, Japan. She is famous for her best-selling manga series Zetsuai 1989, which is considered to have redefined the Shōnen-ai/Yaoi genres in the late 1980s/early 1990s. Her old pen name is Ryo Minami (南亮, Minami Ryo), but in 1986 she changed her pen name to Minami Ozaki. She sometimes uses other pseudonym—Minami Himemuro (姫室ミナミ).

In 1988 (at the age of 20), her first manga series, Chūsei no Akashi (Proof of Loyalty), was serialized in Margaret Comics.

Her success with Zetsuai 1989 has led Helen McCarthy to describe Ozaki as "one of the queens of shojo and shonen-ai manga". Through her Captain Tsubasa dojinshi, Ozaki "played a strong role" in "revamping the boys-love genre" in the 1980s. Her hallmark is "prolonged erotic psychodramas" which has earned her a "cult following" through Margaret. Rachel Thorn describes her as being a "mania-oriented" artist, with "extremely stylized" character designs and page layouts with a "dream-like quality". Her style had an enormous influence on later shōjo writers.

== List of works ==
- Chūsei no Akashi, 1988
- 3 Days, 1989
- Zetsuai 1989, 1989
- Bad Blood, 1992
- Bronze: Zetsuai Since 1989, since 1991
- Devil Children, 2011

Boy Abyss

=== Dōjinshi ===
Since 1984 Minami Ozaki has published many yaoi dōjinshi. The biggest circles are:

- NTT
- Calekka
- Club Doll
- Kreuz
