= My First Girlfriend Is a Gal =

Japanese manga series

- Cover of the first tankōbon volume featuring Junichi Hashiba (left) and Yukana Yame (center)

はじめてのギャル (Hajimete no Gyaru)
- Genre: Harem; Romantic comedy; Slice of life
- Manga
- Written by: Meguru Ueno
- Published by: Kadokawa Shoten
- Imprint: Kadokawa Comics A
- Magazine: Monthly Shōnen Ace
- Original run: November 26, 2015 – present
- Volumes: 22
- Anime television series
- Directed by: Hiroyuki Furukawa; Yūki Ogawa (assistant)
- Produced by: Jōtarō Ishigami; Ichigo Yamada
- Written by: Yūichirō Momose
- Music by: Yashikin
- Studio: NAZ
- Licensed by: Crunchyroll (streaming); SA/SEA: Medialink
- Original network: AT-X, Tokyo MX, Sun TV, Mie TV, BS11, KBS, GBS
- Original run: July 12, 2017 – September 13, 2017
- Episodes: 10 + OVA
- icon

My First Girlfriend Is a Gal (Japanese: はじめてのギャル, Hepburn: Hajimete no Gyaru; lit. "My First Gal"), also known as Hajimete no Gal, is a Japanese manga series by Meguru Ueno. It has been serialized in Kadokawa Shoten's shōnen manga magazine Monthly Shōnen Ace since November 2015, and has been collected in twenty-two tankōbon volumes. A ten-episode anime television series adaptation produced by NAZ aired from July to September 2017.

== Plot ==
High school boy Junichi Hashiba laments not having a girlfriend as his classmates have seemed to be pairing up everywhere. His single unattached friends force him into boldly confessing his love to Yukana Yame, a beautiful "gal" at the school. Although Yukana easily determines that Junichi really just wants to lose his virginity, she agrees to be his girlfriend. Junichi soon attracts the affections of other girls who have known Junichi or Yukana for a while, including his childhood friend and neighbor Nene Fujinoki, Yukana's gal friend Ranko Honjō, and the school's madonna Yui Kashī.

== Characters ==
Junichi Hashiba (羽柴 ジュンイチ, Hashiba Jun'ichi)
Voiced by: Shintarō Asanuma (Japanese); Alejandro Saab (English)
Junichi is a second-year high school boy who wishes to have a girlfriend. At the start of the series, he is set up by his friends to confess his love to Yukana Yame. While he is internally thrilled to see Yukana's sexy body, he is easily embarrassed when Yukana confronted him for such lewd actions. He regularly has sexual fantasies of losing his virginity and is depicted as having internal debates in his head over what to do in situations. His friends also pressure him to hook them up with girls. As he learns that Yukana does indeed like him, he tries to remain loyal to her, turning down the other girls that make advances on him. Later in the series, he enters university.
Yukana Yame (八女 ゆかな, Yame Yukana)
Voiced by: Yuki Nagaku (Japanese); Jamie Marchi (English)
Yukana is a fashionable high school "gal" with strawberry blonde hair, green eyes, a busty chest, loose socks, and a carefree attitude. She was very guarded about lewd stuff, calling it gross, but agrees to be Junichi's girlfriend. She finds Junichi to be transparent with his emotions and reactions, and often calls Junichi out for being a lewd virgin who is interested in her body, but teases and flirts with him too. Underneath she is very caring, and seeks her friends' advice often on how to relate to Jun better, being a little naive sometimes on applying the advice. On occasion, she lowers her guard and lets him touch her if it helps affirm how committed she is to the relationship. She gets jealous of the other girls that flirt with Junichi, except for Nene, who she thinks her little sister behavior is too cute to be taken seriously. She later goes to the same university as Junichi.
Ranko Honjō (本城 蘭子, Honjō Ranko)
Voiced by: Eri Kitamura (Japanese); Morgan Garrett (English)
Yukana's childhood friend is a tall tan-skinned gal with short light blonde hair, light purple eyes, and a big chest. She is very aggressive, making moves on Junichi which makes Yukana jealous.^{Ch. 14-15, 20} She reveals to Junichi that she loves Yukana and is possessive of her; she does not like Yukana being so close to Junichi,^{Ch. 22, 29} even if it means having to have sex with Junichi herself. Junichi is terrified of Ranko, and does whatever he can to avoid her aggressive advances and keep her far away from him.
Nene Fujinoki (藤ノ木 寧音, Fujinoki Nene)
Voiced by: Yui Ogura (Japanese); Brittany Lauda (English)
A petite but big-breasted first-year high school girl who styles her hair in buns.^{Ch. 23} She and Junichi are childhood friends, but she is obsessed with Junichi, and initially tried to dress and act like a little sister because he had expressed interest in that genre of video games. She briefly tries the gal lifestyle to try to win Junichi over, and later tries to attack him by lying on top of him naked in bed, but Junichi rejects her. She then decides to openly compete with Yukana, going back to her bun hairstyle, but then she turns back to be a gal again. In the anime, Junichi's friends regard her as a "loli with big boobs".^{Ep. 1}
Yui Kashī (香椎 結衣, Kashī Yui)
Voiced by: Ayana Taketatsu (Japanese); Alison Viktorin (English)
Junichi's classmate and class representative, who has long dark hair and reddish eyes. Junichi's friends regard her as the school's madonna, smart and beautiful, like a character from a manga or a video game,^{Ch. 27, 29} but with a modest chest size compared to the other girls.^{Ep. 1} She has known Jun since middle school and initially acts very friendly and nice around him.^{Ch. 27, 29} She secretly dresses up as a blonde-haired (red hair in the anime) twin-tailed idol named BoA who does live streams on the internet. She is upset that Junichi, whom she deems her number-one servant because he had helped carry boxes for her or picked up her eraser, does not fawn over her like an obedient pet because he is with Yukana. She tries to remedy that by pulling him aside and asking him to dump Yukana and go out with her. When Jun refuses, she gets very angry and threatens him until Ranko saves him by threatening to reveal her net identity.^{Ch. 32-36} She becomes more attracted to Junichi beyond just wanting him to be her pet, and eventually confesses to Junichi and is rejected. She then strives to be his second girlfriend as in a harem,^{Ch. 60-61} even following the two to university.
Shinpei Sakamoto (坂本 慎平, Sakamoto Shinpei)
Voiced by: Toshiyuki Toyonaga (Japanese); Brad Smeaton (English)
A glasses-wearing classmate with short bluish hair who is part of Junichi's group of perverted friends.^{Ch. 1, 27} He, Junichi, and Yui were classmates before in middle school.^{Ch. 29} He is the one who usually initiates the plans and recommendations for Junichi, including planning the confession, giving movie tickets to Junichi, and others. He is also the first to make the connection between Yui and online idol named BoA.^{Ch. 35} Shinpei has an older cousin named Sayaka,^{Ch. 45} who attends university and is involved in a manga club.^{Ch. 50}
Keigo Ishida (石田 景吾, Ishida Keigo)
Voiced by: Kenji Akabane (Japanese); Jacob Browning (English)
A blonde-haired classmate who is part of Junichi's group of perverted friends.^{Ch. 1, 27}
Minoru Kobayakawa (小早川 稔, Kobayakawa Minoru)
Voiced by: Minoru Shiraishi (Japanese); Cris George (English)
An obese classmate who is part of Junichi's group of perverted friends. Of the three friends, he mentions that he likes little girls.^{Ep. 1}^{Ch. 1, 27, 31, 32}
Ayumi Kamisaka (上坂 歩美, Kamisaka Ayumi)
Voiced by: Kazusa Aranami (Japanese); Kristin Sutton (English)
Yukana's gal friend with medium brown hair and blue eyes.^{Ch. 7} She is more of a background character in the manga, but has a larger role in the anime.
Kokoro Shīna (椎名 心, Shīna Kokoro)
Voiced by: Natsuko Hara (Japanese); Annabel Thorne (English)
Yukana's gal friend with blonde hair stylized in tails tied with red ribbons.^{Ch. 7} She is more of a background character in the manga, but has a larger role in the anime.
Yuki Kashī (香椎結騎, Kashī Yuki)
Yui's younger brother who dresses up as an attractive girl at school, flirting with and teasing Junichi. Yuki is very fond of Yui, but when he notices she has been off because of her love for Junichi, he tries to support her and disrupt Junichi's relationship with Yukana. This is so that Yui can return to being the strong older sister.^{Ch. 53-58}
Iris Kotohayashi (紅桃林イリス(ことばやし いりす), Kotobayashi Irisu)
The student council president who dislikes that Junichi has attracted a harem of pretty girls at school. She has long blonde hair, and is part French and part Japanese. She has a reputation of imprisoning students like in the Prison School manga.^{Ch. 65-66}
Kiyo Gokomachi (御幸町貴代, Gokomachi Kiyo)
Junichi's next-door neighbor at university. They share a wall in the apartment complex but it is so poorly constructed it breaks into a hole.^{Ch. 128-132}
Karin Kurihama (久里浜叶凛, Kuriwama Karin)
A first-year student who joins Junichi in the otaku research club at university. She has light hair and a cheery attitude. She aspires to be a manga artist, and recruits him to teach her about putting romance into her manga.^{Ch. 133-136}
Omae Sakurako (おまえ さくらこ, Omae Sakurako)
President of the otaku research club at university.^{Ch. 134}

== Media ==
=== Manga ===
As of September 2026, the series has been released in twenty-two tankōbon volumes.

| No. | Release date | ISBN |
|---|---|---|
| 1 | May 26, 2016 | 978-4-04-104265-6 |
| 2 | October 26, 2016 | 978-4-04-105032-3 |
| 3 | March 25, 2017 | 978-4-04-105455-0 |
| 4 | June 26, 2017 | 978-4-04-105777-3 |
| 5 | December 26, 2017 | 978-4-04-105776-6; 978-4-04-106019-3 (SE) |
| 6 | June 25, 2018 | 978-4-04-105775-9 |
| 7 | October 26, 2018 | 978-4-04-107472-5 |
| 8 | March 25, 2019 | 978-4-04-107473-2 |
| 9 | September 25, 2019 | 978-4-04-108584-4 |
| 10 | February 25, 2020 | 978-4-04-108585-1 |
| 11 | July 21, 2020 | 978-4-04-109738-0 |
| 12 | January 26, 2021 | 978-4-04-109739-7 |
| 13 | July 26, 2021 | 978-4-04-111583-1 |
| 14 | January 26, 2022 | 978-4-04-111585-5 |
| 15 | July 26, 2022 | 978-4-04-112719-3 |
| 16 | February 24, 2023 | 978-4-04-113368-2 |
| 17 | August 25, 2023 | 978-4-04-114024-6 |
| 18 | March 26, 2024 | 978-4-04-114764-1 |
| 19 | September 25, 2024 | 978-4-04-115524-0 |
| 20 | April 25, 2025 | 978-4-04-116230-9 |
| 21 | January 23, 2026 | 978-4-04-117034-2 |
| 22 | September 25, 2026 | 978-4-04-117761-7 |

=== Anime ===
A 10-episode anime television series adaptation by NAZ aired from July 12 to September 13, 2017. The series was directed and character designed by Hiroyuki Furukawa, who also did the erotic comedy My Wife is the Student Council President. The script was supervised by Yuichiro Momose, and the music was done by Yashikin of MAGES. The opening theme is "Hajimete no Season" (はじめてのSEASON) by Junjō no Afilia, while the ending theme is "Galtic Love" (GAL的LOVE) by Erabareshi. An OVA episode was released on December 26, 2017.

Crunchyroll streamed the series with original Japanese version and English subtitles, while Funimation licensed and premiered it in North America with an English dub. Following Sony's acquisition of Crunchyroll, the dub was moved to Crunchyroll.

| No. | Title (Note: All English episode titles are taken from Crunchyroll.) | Directed by | Written by | Original air date |
|---|---|---|---|---|
| 1 | "My First Time Begging for It"; Transliteration: "Hajimete no Dogeza" (Japanese: はじめての土下座) | Kazuya Aiura | Yūichirō Momose | July 12, 2017 |
High school guy Junichi watches as many of his schoolmates have coupled up, leaving him and his guy friends without any girls. When his friends start reading erotic magazines in class, Junichi is caught holding a copy in front of the fashionable and pretty Yukana Yame, who is disgusted. His friends choose Jun to ask her out because she is a "gal", a type of high school girl reputed to be very sexually promiscuous. They place a confession letter in her shoe locker. Junichi is shocked to see Yukana and confesses to her in a dogeza-position as suggested by his friend Shinpei. Yukana is uncertain at first, even guessing correctly that he is a virgin and that he is mostly interested in staying where he is so he can stare at her panties. But despite seeing him completely embarrassed about that, she agrees to be his girlfriend.
| 2 | "My First Karaoke"; Transliteration: "Hajimete no Karaoke" (Japanese: はじめてのカラオケ) | Daiji Iwanaga | Yūichirō Momose | July 19, 2017 |
The day after the confession, Junichi is still shocked and how he will treat Yukana. Shinpei suggests Junichi have a karaoke date where they can make out in the private room. Yukana announces she is dating Junichi in front of their class. Afterward, she invites Junichi to karaoke as she has done with her friends before. As they sing, Junichi has fantasies of seducing Yukana. Recalling Shinpei's advice, he attempts to kiss her, but Yukana stops it by suddenly pointing out his protruding nose hair. Although she laughs it off, when she leaves the room, she thinks over Junichi's attempt. As they leave the karaoke place, Ranko sees them from a distance.
| 3 | "My First Spray-On Gal"; Transliteration: "Hajimete no Kuro Gyaru" (Japanese: はじめての黒ギャル) | Yūsaku Saotome | Makoto Takada | July 26, 2017 |
Junichi feels obligated to honor an invitation placed in his shoe locker. He ends up meeting Ranko, who aggressively seduces Junichi until Yukana stops them. Yukana tells Junichi that Ranko is her childhood friend, but that she is "dangerous", which is soon affirmed when Ranko secretly vows to destroy the relationship between Yukana and Junichi. The next day, Junichi, Yukana, and Ranko are wandering in the city when they are approached by two guys who make a move on Yukana. Although Junichi's attempts to protect Yukana result in him being shoved away, Ranko agrees to join the two guys, only to beat them up shortly afterward. Ranko later shows up at Junichi's house where she seduces Junichi again, deducing that he is a virgin and that he is dating Yukana because he wants to get laid. Junichi denies the allegations and declares he only wants to have sex with the girl he really loves. His statement infuriates Ranko and she becomes more aggressive until Yukana sees them again in an awkward position. Yukana plays it down and leaves the residence with Ranko. As the girls leave, Junichi's classmate Yui views them from a distance.
| 4 | "My First Serious Gal"; Transliteration: "Hajimete no Seiso Gyaru" (Japanese: はじめての清楚ギャル) | Taku Yamada | Masamune Kuji | August 2, 2017 |
This episode starts as Yui reminisces herself, seemingly satisfied as being greeted by her classmates, especially Junichi. Then Junichi conducts research on gyarus (gal) and ended up in an online show featuring a stylish girl who berates people while her followers agree thru chat. At school, Yui arrives as classmates greeted. Unknown to them, Yui treats and thinks them low like maids and butlers. Keigo, along with Junichi, Shinpei, and Minoru, discusses the girl he saw online last night. He shows them his phone with the girl he saw. Shinpei doubts the image as he previously saw the girl somewhere else. Yukana joins her friends and Yui seizes the opportunity of having a conversation with Junichi. At the cafe, Yui berates Yukana while Junichi is seemingly unsure on his position as he and Yukana were officially dating. Meanwhile, Shinpei watches Boa, the stylish girl who streams online while berating people and finally realizes that girl he somewhere knew and Boa was just one person as he hits the Print-Screen button. The next day, Shinpei discusses his discovery to Keigo and Minoru that Boa and Yui were indeed a one person (thru her berating opinion which links them and comparing images) and Ranko butts-in to their discussion. Yui invites Junichi to the rooftop and confesses that she likes him, ordering him to break up with Yukana. Junichi turns down Yui's confession, but the later suddenly outbursts her dissatisfaction that Junichi should follow her like a dog. She threatens Junichi to reveal their conversation at the cafe to Yukana but his perverted friends along with Ranko arrives. Ranko threatens Yui that she will reveal to the class her Boa identity if she continues to blackmail Junichi. Yui gives the memory card to Junichi as she leaves in dismay. Yukana also appears after the confrontation and is happy to know that Junichi is still head over heels to her. After the post-credits, Yui vows vengeance while walking. At the salon, a well-bosomed lady is satisfied on her makeover.
| 5 | "My First Half-Assed Gal"; Transliteration: "Hajimete no Pagyaru" (Japanese: はじめてのパギャル) | Yūsaku Saotome; Takayuki Kuriyama; Yasuhiro Noda | Yūichirō Momose | August 9, 2017 |
Junichi is experiencing a dream of Yukana until he wakes up and sees a little busty pink-haired lady on his chest. The lady reveals to him that she is Nene, who had a gyaru-styled makeover, despite not being proficient in speaking like a gyaru. On their way to school, Nene clings to Junichi and the latter's perverted friends see him in envy. Minoru, who has an obsession with little busty girls, is quickly fascinated to Nene but suddenly gets disappointed upon learning her age. At the shoe locker, Junichi is greeted by Yui, who tries to make amends with him from their previous confrontation. Nene appears to both of them and quickly berates Yui due to her mentality and flat-chestedness. At lunch break, Junichi is eating together with Yukana while Ranko guarding them both. Nene joins the lunch and Yukana barely recognize Nene, while the latter competes herself to Ranko and Yukana by bumping their breasts, much to Junichi's delight. Later at night and after watching Yui's Boa Online show, Junichi tries to sleep but a naked Nene appears on him which demands to have sex with her. Though his libido kicks in, he remains loyal to Yukana by refusing to have sex with Nene. Nene left and vows to get Junichi's affection someday. The next day, Junichi seems to be worried about Nene and Yukana approaches him, expressing concern over his worries and suggests that they will go somewhere. Nene interferes and continues to cling on Junichi and Yukana is unaffected by it and smiles at them.
| 6 | "My First Time at Yame's House"; Transliteration: "Hajimete no Yame-san chi" (Japanese: はじめての八女さん家) | Yūsaku Saotome | Yūichirō Momose | August 16, 2017 |
Shinpei and his perverted friends discuss Junichi's relationship progress and suggests to make it naughtier by playing a King game. Yukana invites Junichi to come to her house, which the latter suggests inviting Ranko and Nene, as well as his perverted friends, much to Yukana's dismay. As Junichi daydreams on taking advantage of Yukana, Yui appears on him and inadvertently invited as well. At Yukana's house, she gets changed and invites Junichi to her room. Delighted to the interior of her room, Junichi also gets delighted on Yukana's sensual appearance while the latter seemingly teases him. Their sensual moment is being interrupted by the arrival of Ranko, Nene, and Yui, Then came the perverted friends which they wear weird attire. Shinpei initiates the King game and everyone seems to be having fun until Shinpei and Junichi devise a plan to gain a kiss with Yukana. The round which involves kissing ended up on all boys, which revealed as Junichi rigged the selection to save the girls despite he might kissing his perverted friends. After the humiliating dare of kissing, Yukana invites everyone to summer vacation, but everyone doesn't have enough money to spend. They decided to take part-time jobs to fill up their proposed summer vacation.
| 7 | "My First Job"; Transliteration: "Hajimete no Baito" (Japanese: はじめてのバイト) | Takashi Kobayashi | Makoto Takada | August 23, 2017 |
Shinpei discusses with his perverted friends and Junichi about job placings posted on the internet and decided to work for their preparation on the upcoming summer vacation. Junichi applies for a kitchen staff on a cosplay-themed cafe and it happens as Yukana, Ranko, Yui and Nene work as cosplayed waitresses on the same workplace. As days pass on their part-time jobs, the cosplay-themed cafe where Junichi and the girls working, the supervisor had a nefarious plan to hold an event that will somewhat boost the cafe. The supervisor gives them books that contain lewd and sensual stories, camouflaged as ordinary books. As the girls read, Junichi and Yukana are somewhat aroused but manage to fend off by realizing that something is wrong with the event that will be going to happen. Junichi angrily tells the supervisor about respect towards the girls but the supervisor ignores his plea. Yui decides to take matters into her own hands as she contacts the owner of the cafe itself and threatens the supervisor. The event is canceled and they finally take their hard-worked earnings. At the post-credits scene, the summer vacation has finally come and the gang happily meet at their rendezvous point.
| 8 | "My First Trip"; Transliteration: "Hajimete no ryokō" (Japanese: はじめての旅行) | Daiji Iwanaga | Masamune Kuji | August 30, 2017 |
Junichi, Yukana and friends finally hit the beach. With the girls having a good time on the sea with Junichi, Shinpei and his perverted buddies are seemingly bored while their eyes peeled on ladies wearing swimsuits. In the evening, the girls spend time on the hot springs while Shinpei continues his nefarious scheme of peeking on the girls. As the boys march to the hot springs, Junichi tries to foil Shinpei's plan but the latter concludes that Junichi is somewhat traitor. Junichi and Shinpei bicker around the forest until Junichi falls down to the cliff. Shinpei and Keigo continue marching towards to the hot springs however traps are scattered and they are unsuccessful, tripping a switch that creates a beautiful fireworks display which the girls see it with delight. The girls continue their bonding by spending on the beach with string fireworks. Yukana finds the unconscious Junichi and they talked about their upcoming date. As the two brewed sweetness, Yui, Ranko, and Nene see them in envy. At the post-credits scene, Yukana and Junichi are back to the city and a guy whose formerly acquainted to Yukana greets them.
| 9 | "My First Fight"; Transliteration: "Hajimete no kenka" (Japanese: はじめてのケンカ) | Tatsuya Sasaki; Kanji Miyake | Yūichirō Momose | September 6, 2017 |
Yukana's middle school friend Dai Mitarai bumps into her and Junichi. Junichi begins to feel that she took an interest of her friend more than him because of his looks. After thinking that she likes him more, Yukana gets angry and leaves Junichi in a huff, making him feel worse. During school, Junichi tries his attempts to talk to Yukana, but she gives him the silent treatment. His friends tried to cheer him up by going to karaoke and succeeded, but then backfired when they saw Yukana talking to Dai. After a conversation another day, Junichi runs into Yukana, and then accuses her of messing with his heart and ends his relationship with her, leaving her heartbroken. Yui comes to talk to him and becomes mad at him for being selfish about what he thinks. Nene scolds him as well. Yukana meet with her friends and at the moment she is about to speak, she cries. Ranko becomes furious and storms off to find Junichi. At the restaurant, where Ranko finds Junichi and his friends there, Dai came in with his gang and Junichi and the rest listened about what they're going to do to Yukana. Ranko goes to them, but Junichi steps in and comes towards them.
| 10 | "My First Confession"; Transliteration: "Hajimete no Kokuhaku" (Japanese: はじめての告白) | Takashi Takeuchi | Yūichirō Momose | September 13, 2017 |
The episode opens without the traditional opening theme and title with Junichi confronting Dai and his friends. They go outside to settle matters. Dai starts winning the fight, but Junichi grabs then bites Dai's leg. Dai summons his friends to beat Junichi to no avail. When Dai promises to stop bothering Yukana Junichi releases his leg. Dai immediately kicks him repeatedly. Ranko steps in with Junichi's friends. Ranko encourages Junichi to find Yukana to make amends. After he leaves her and Junichi's friends beat and humiliate Dai and his group. Yukana does not answer her phone calls from a running and frantic Junichi. She remains in the cafe with Nene and Yui where they tell her to meet Junichi and air out their feelings. After Yukana leaves, Yui and Nene contemplate if it is right to help their "rival." After a long wait, Junichi finally meets Yukana behind the school and make amends, recreating his first confession while in a dogeza. After their romantic reconciliation, Yukana decides to take Junichi to spend the day at the amusement park. They go to a photo booth and take a picture together with Junichi attempting to kiss her. At the end of their date, Yukana confesses to him that she would like to return with him the following year to the amusement park and then all years after. She then unexpectedly kisses Junichi right before she leaves for home, surprising him. The scene closes with the title はじめての告白 "My First Confession." After the title, the credits appear over a scene of Junichi walking to school with the opening theme playing in the background. He first meets Yui and gives his thanks for her advice. He then asks her if she has ever done streaming videos, implying that he knows about Yui's identity as Boa from the previous episode. A blushing and stammering Yui pretends to have no idea what he is asking about. Nene interrupts them and exclaims that his face looks handsome again. Ranko and Yukana then appear. All notice Yukana blushing. Nene and Yui grouse that "something" happened between the two, but Ranko laughingly asks, "You're still a virgin, right?" only to whisper to him that she will kill him if not. Yukana takes his hand and both run away towards the school entrance.
| 11 (OVA) (Note: The possible canon counterpart is Chapters 70–73, found in the sixth tankōbon volume.) | "My First Cultural Festival"; Transliteration: "Hajimete no Bunkasai" (Japanese: はじめての文化祭) | Daiji Iwanaga; Keisuke Nishijima | Yūichirō Momose | December 26, 2017 |
It starts with the cosplay cafe set up by Junichi's class for the school's culture festival and Yui, with a mean gal personality, and Yukana, looking like a proper girl, greeting customers before cutting into the opening. In the kitchen, Junichi and his friends comment on how great of an idea the cafe was while Shinpei cackles. Ranko enters the cafe and teases Yui for her appearance but is interrupted by Yukana. Ranko asks for Junichi and Yukana informs her that he is in the kitchen before Yui slams a pitcher of iced water on the table, resulting in increased tension between Yui and Ranko, which the oblivious Yukana mistakes for them getting along. When the time comes to change shifts, Keigo asks if Junichi wants to check out the other classrooms but Yukana gets to him first. He tries with his other groupies to no avail. Ranko changes into her main outfit as it is time for her shift while Nene invites Yukana to visit her class. Yukana and her friends discuss the urban legend of their school after Yukana teases them for their intention to find guys from other schools who visit theirs. Yukana and Junichi walk around the campus and goes to Nene's class, an animal cafe (with Nene herself being a rabbit). After leaving, Junichi asks Yukana what animal she would be and she replies with a meow (nyaa). Elsewhere, Nene and Ranko scheme while Yui bribes Shinpei to help with her own scheme where he yanks Junichi away from his date to help with an issue that arose: Minoru's runaway lolicon club. He then pulls him back for another discussion only to steal his phone and speed away. Junichi chases after him only to be stopped by Nene who then drags him away; meanwhile, Yukana waits for Junichi to return only to have Ranko make contact with her instead. Yukana agrees to walk around with Ranko but reminds her that she's meeting up with Junichi later. Nene and Junichi enter a haunted house only for Yui to scare Nene away and ask Junichi to help with the dance preparations. Junichi spots Shinpei merrily eating cotton candy and chases after him, demanding that he return his phone, however, he successfully distracts Junichi but gets trapped in a pitfall, after which Junichi retrieved his phone to contact Yukana only to find that it is dead. The dance party starts and both Junichi and Yukana try to find each other. When they do, they simultaneously apologize for not contacting the other and dance the final song together.

== Reception ==
The anime's first episode was reviewed by various writers at Anime News Network. James Beckett found that the fanservice to be as expected and that it embodied "all of the most irritating sex comedy stereotypes that stopped being funny back when the American Pie sequels fizzled out over a decade ago." Nick Creamer found the censorship bars to be the only unique thing about the show, and that the central characters were not likable. Theron Martin held out some hope that Yukana would at least have some character depth. Paul Jensen found the premise of two characters from different social circles to have potential, but the first episode to be obnoxious and dumb, outside of some moments where Yukana reacts to Junichi's confession. Rebecca Silverman regarded the episode as mostly fetishism and unless that was toned down and "starts to develop Yukana as a real person, it could be a somewhat smarty raunchy comedy," but did not plan to watch any more to find out.

== See also ==
- Does a Hot Elf Live Next Door to You?, another manga series by the same author
- Gal-sen, another manga series by the same author

== Works cited ==
- "Ch." is shortened form for chapter and refers to a chapter number of the Hajimete no Gal manga
- "Ep." is shortened form for episode and refers to an episode number of the My First Girlfriend Is a Gal anime
