= 07-Ghost =

Japanese manga series

- Cover of 07-Ghost manga volume 1 featuring Frau (Zehel) and Teito Klein

セブンゴースト (Sebun Gōsuto)
- Genre: Action; Gothic fantasy
- Manga
- Written by: Yuki Amemiya; Yukino Ichihara
- Published by: Ichijinsha
- English publisher: AUS: Madman Entertainment; NA: Viz Media
- Magazine: Monthly Comic Zero Sum
- Original run: June 2005 – August 28, 2013
- Volumes: 17
- Anime television series
- Directed by: Yoshihiro Takamoto
- Written by: Natsuko Takahashi
- Studio: Studio Deen
- Licensed by: NA: Discotek Media
- Original network: ytv, CTC, FCT, MMT, Teletama, RNB, RKK, RNC, TVA, tvk, TVQ, HBC, AT-X
- Original run: 7 April 2009 – 22 September 2009
- Episodes: 25
- Manga

07-Ghost Children
- Written by: Yuki Amemiya; Yukino Ichihara
- Published by: Ichijinsha
- Magazine: Monthly Comic Zero Sum
- Original run: 2009 – 2010
- Volumes: 1
- icon

07-Ghost (セブンゴースト, Sebun Gōsuto) (stylized as 07-GHOST) is a Japanese manga series written and illustrated by Yuki Amemiya and Yukino Ichihara. It is set in a fantasy world with different laws, kingdoms, gods and magic. It was serialized in Ichijinsha's josei manga magazine Monthly Comic Zero Sum from June 2005 to August 28, 2013, with its chapters collected in Seventeen tankōbon volumes as of September 2013. The manga was originally licensed by Go! Comi for release in North America, but they stopped publishing in October 2009 and Viz Media has since picked up the license for the series. The series has been adapted into a drama CD and an anime television series from Studio Deen, which debuted in April 2009.

== Plot ==
Teito Klein is a former slave who now attends the Barsburg Empire's military academy due to his ability to use a rare and highly prized type of supernatural force known as Zaiphon.

Teito is an amnesiac who frequently has frightening dreams. The night before the graduation exam, Teito and his only friend, Mikage, vow they will never abandon each other. The next day, Teito overhears people talking about him. Stopping to listen, he suddenly realizes that the speaker, Chief of Staff Ayanami, is the person who killed the familiar man in his dreams: His father, the king of the destroyed Raggs Kingdom. Teito is caught eavesdropping and tries to attack Ayanami but is quickly brought down by one of his subordinates and sent to prison. Mikage comes to help him escape, only to find that Teito has managed to fight past the guards all by himself. The two flee the building, but are cornered on a balcony. Teito pretends to hold Mikage hostage, then makes his escape, though he is wounded by a Zaiphon blast that Ayanami directs at him. Three bishops in the nearby 7th District discover the injured Teito and take him to a nearby church to recuperate, where he's protected because of the 7th District's law of sanctuary.

In due time, it is discovered that Teito carries the Eye of Mikhail, a powerful talisman for which his home country was destroyed. This fact, as well as a fateful reunion, catapults Teito into a quest for revenge against the Barsburg Empire and for knowledge about his past. At the same time, his status as the bearer of the Eye of Mikhail throws him into the long-standing conflict with the evil Verloren and his enemies, the 07 Ghosts.

== Setting ==
The book is set in the midst of the Barsburg Empire, which is divided into seven districts, each with its own cities, rulers, and culture.

=== Zaiphon ===
Zaiphon is the "magic" of 07-Ghosts world, the ability to convert life energy into various forms of power and is the force which keeps the continent afloat in the sky. Zaiphon is controlled by converting strong emotions into power, often taking the shape of words, though people may use weapons to channel said energy. Those who have the ability to use Zaiphon are rare and thought of as having been blessed by God. Every user's capabilities are different, and in many cases, reflect their nature. Zaiphon is generally categorized into three types:

- Healing Zaiphon: People with healing Zaiphon are capable of healing wounds as well as sharing and/or transferring their Zaiphon to others. Characters who primarily use healing Zaiphon are Labrador, Assistant Archbishop Bastien, Ouka, and Capella.
- Offensive Zaiphon: People with offensive Zaiphon can strike enemies at different ranges and protect themselves from attacks directed at them. Characters who primarily use offensive Zaiphon are Teito, Mikage, Ayanami, Hakuren, Frau, and Capella.
- Manipulation Zaiphon: People with manipulation Zaiphon (which is even rarer then those who can use Zaiphon) can alter the shape and/or nature of things. So far, Labrador and Castor are the only known users of this type of Zaiphon.

It is possible for a person to use more than one version of Zaiphon; however, people who can successfully do so are few and far between.

There are a variety of weapons used to manipulate Zaiphon, one of these being the bascule. With the bascule, people can channel their Zaiphon and use it for several purposes. Different types of Zaiphon have different effects when used through a bascule: those with healing Zaiphon cannot directly attack a Kor, but they can restrict and remove Kor from afflicted people, and those with offensive Zaiphon can directly attack a Kor.

=== 07-Ghosts and Verloren ===
According to a centuries-old myth, the God of Death, Verloren (Dutch or German for Lost), "killed" the daughter of the Chief of Heaven and was forced to escape to the earth. In retribution, Verloren invaded the hearts of the people, who slipped into despair. Lamenting over the people's suffering, the Chief of Heaven dispatched seven heavenly lights in order to punish Verloren. Called the "Seven Ghosts", they are said to have sealed Verloren on the earth and served forevermore as the guardians of the Empire. Mothers often tell their children that if they are naughty, the Seven Ghosts will come to take them away.

Though Verloren has been sealed away in Pandora's Box for over 1000 years, his messengers, the Kor, find and contact humans to bring them under his influence. If a contract is made, a mark appears on the person's chest. This is known as "Verloren's curse", and it indicates one's heart has been consumed by darkness. One of the duties of the "07-Ghosts" is to fight against Verloren and his curse and stop contracts from being fulfilled. Only the Bishops can remove Verloren's curse.

The 07-Ghosts are embodied in humans with such extraordinary Zaiphon abilities that they are considered to be blessed by God. They were originally fragments of Verloren, and they were sent down to the earth by the Chief of Heaven in order to stop Verloren. Each of the 07-Ghosts has died in his previous life, and they all retain their memories of their past lives. Frau, Castor, Labrador, Fea Kreuz and Lance have been revealed to be Ghosts thus far; all of them have the mark of their Ghosts on their hands. The Ghosts' names are Zehel, Fest, Prophet, Landkarte, Reliquie (or Relikt), Eher and Vertrag, all of which have Dutch or German origins. Each of the Ghosts has a specific power:

- Zehel – 斬魂 "The Cutting Spirit" (Frau; the Ghost who severs bonds)
- Fest – 繋魂 "The Tying Spirit" (Castor; the Ghost who binds souls together)
- Profe – 言魂 "The Speaking Spirit" (Labrador; the Ghost who prophesies)
- Reliquie/Relikt – 遺魂 "The Bequeathing Spirit" (Lance; the Ghost who sees one's past)
- Vertrag – 契魂 "The Pledging Spirit" (Fea Kreuz; the Ghost who manipulates souls)
- Landkarte – 消魂 "The Extinguishing Spirit" (Katsuragi; the Ghost who sent something or himself away to a certain place)
- Ea – 醒魂 "The Awaking Spirit" (Kal; the Ghost who assigns numbers to every soul in the world and determines their destination after death)

Some editions may translate the Ghosts name wrong. Since all their names come from German, the names have a meaning in this language, and are not just a name. For example, it is common to see the name "Randkalt" ("Rand" meaning "Edge" whilst "Kalt" means "Cold") making the name meaningless. On the other hand, the name "Landkarte" means "Map", which corresponds with Landkarte's ability. The same happens with the Ghosts Reliquie/Rilikt and Ea, which are not German words.

=== The Three Wishes ===
When a person is given a life from the Chief of the Heavens, they choose three dreams to complete over the course of their lifetime. When all the dreams are granted, their souls will be called back to the Chief and be reincarnated. However, when people are born they do not remember the dreams they chose, and finding out the dreams is supposedly the joy of life.

There are evil beings who want to interfere with this process; among them are Verloren's messengers, the Kor, who steal dreams and drag humans into darkness. When a human's first dream is granted by a Kor, the person's heart becomes unstable and unable to be satisfied no matter what he or she does. When the second dream is granted, the person falls into a state of starvation or addiction. When the third dream is granted, the soul has indulged in too much darkness and becomes forever unable to return to the Chief of Heaven. The Kor then takes the body; a possessed body with all three dreams fulfilled by the Kor is called a Wars (warusa means "evil" in Japanese), and they serve Verloren. A dark magician who can control the Wars is called a Warsfeil.

It is the duty of the church to protect people from the Kor, because the feeling of addiction is very difficult to remove. There are cases when a Kor may grant a wish that is not one of the three dreams, but it upsets the equilibrium and the Kor may be punished for it.

=== The Eyes of Mikhail and Raphael ===
The Eyes of Mikhail and Raphael are a set of holy stones that can be embedded into the body, allowing the Archangels Mikhail and Raphael to descend into a host's body for a limited time. They are undetectable until they possess their host's body, whereupon the stone appears in the host's hand, the host's eye color changes, and they become able to wield godlike powers with Zaiphon. Before the storyline of "07-Ghost," the royal family of the Kingdom of Raggs held the Eye of Mikhail and the Barsburg Empire held the Eye of Raphael. A pact was established between both countries never to seize the other Eye; however, the Barsburg Empire broke this pact ten years prior to the storyline.

The Eyes' full usages are unknown; however, thus far, the Eye of Mikhail has been used to seal Verloren's original body in Pandora's Box, and the Eye of Raphael has been said to be able to reincarnate Verloren's soul in human bodies.

The main villains from left to right: Konatsu, Hyuuga and Ayanami, shown in chibi form

=== Style ===
The overall style for 07-Ghost fits into the fantasy manga genre. Although the plot is serious, there is a lot of comic relief, giving the story a more lighthearted tone. The characters are all complex, varied and entertaining, and the story is extremely emotional. It is often disputed as to whether it is a shōnen or shōjo manga, since it has qualities that appeal to both demographics.

"Character designs tend towards the bishōnen type. Even within our circle of bishops, [there's] the naughty rebel, the eyeglass character, and the lolishouta type. Despite the angst filled and mysterious storyline, the manga also includes quite a bit of humor from Teito's and Mikage's horseplay and our three bishops' quirks, and chibis and deformed expressions are used for these scenes."

— Sakura Eries, Mania.com Review

== Characters ==
=== Main characters ===
From left to right: Mikage, Hakuren, Mikage's reincarnated self (Burupya), and Teito

Teito Klein (テイト·クライン, Teito Kurain)
Voiced by: Mitsuki Saiga
The protagonist of the story. His real name is revealed to be Wahrheit (German for truth) Tiashe Raggs, son of Weldeschtein Krom Raggs, and he is the prince of the former Raggs Kingdom. However, after being entrusted with the Eye of Mikhail during the invasion by the Barsburg Empire, his identity was hidden and he was raised by his uncle, Fea Kreuz, as a church orphan. Upon the death of Kreuz, he was made into a combat slave (Sklave in german), but eventually entered the Barsburg military academy and became known as a star pupil. He is a clever student and very talented, making him one of the best students despite other students' mockery.
At the beginning of the story, Teito is a cold and serious student due to his only memories being those of a combat slave whose only purpose was to kill criminals. He is initially cold to Mikage as well, although the two eventually become good friends. Strangely, according to the academy chairman, Miroku, Teito's greatest weakness is his compassion, despite all the hardships he has gone through.
Teito is very skilled with the Bascules, even exceeding the Zaiphon limit twice for it during training. He is very agile and an excellent runner after having trained with Castor's puppets, and manages to get through the examinations on his first try with Hakuren and he became Frau's apprentice. His slave number was 2741.
It is hinted by Mikhail that Teito is the best vessel he has ever had. Teito receives extra abilities as the master of the Eye of Mikhail, such as advanced hearing and a sixth sense. More are said to be sleeping within him. He was made the master of the eye of Mikhail due to the pope inserting Verloren into his body. The Eye was used to seal Verloren's body and protect Teito's soul, making him the Pandora's Box.
Teito ranked first in the latest popularity poll in Monthly Comic Zero Sum.
Frau (フラウ, Furau)
Voiced by: Junichi Suwabe
A perverted Bishop who hides porn in the library (even though it is not allowed for priests to read porn), he saves Teito's life when Teito falls from his hawkzile. He is the member of the 07-Ghosts known as 'Zehel'. He finds Mikage (as a small dragon) for Teito and accidentally becomes Teito's 'Master' when he attempts to remove Teito's promise collar, thereby invoking a blood contract. This collar gives Frau the ability to use three commands on Teito: bind, sleep and pain. For all his teasing, Frau also keeps Teito's spirits up with impromptu pep-talks. His relation with Ayanami is not yet known. Frau is the only Ghost who can wield Verloren's scythe, though how he managed to get this scythe is currently unknown. His catch phrase before every battle is "May God be with you". Frau was ranked second in the latest popularity poll in Monthly Comic Zero Sum.
Castor (カストル, Kasutoru)
Voiced by: Susumu Chiba
Another bishop, he convinces Teito to take the examination to enter the priesthood. The training he puts Teito through is vigorous and often involves his "dolls", life-sized puppets he controls with Zaiphon. He is one of the 07-Ghosts, "Fest". He was the heir of the Hausen House (which symbolize Fest), Xinglu Hausen, who "passed away" ten ago. He was voted fifth in the latest popularity poll in Monthly Comic Zero Sum.
Labrador (ラブラドール, Raburadōru)
Voiced by: Kōki Miyata
A bishop whose hobby is gardening and brewing herbs to make medicine. He was first introduced when Frau found Teito and brought him back to the church. He gives Teito a flower of protection at the start of the manga which later saves his life during an encounter with a Kor. He also gives Teito a drink made from sweet flowers to heal his "wounds of the heart". During battles, he is able to use flowers and vines as weapons with his manipulation Zaiphon. He is also able to communicate with flowers. It has been confirmed by an omake, and later in chapter 46 of the manga, that he is indeed a Ghost, known as 'Profe'. His powers as a Ghost grant him the gift of foresight, which allowed him to aid Teito before Teito's first encounter with a Kor. He does not wish to kill Veloren, only for him to live in the world as a proper human.
Hakuren Oak (ハクレン·オーク, Hakuren Ōku)
Voiced by: Jun Fukuyama
Teito's roommate at the church and, at first, his self-proclaimed rival for the priesthood exam. They first meet soon after Mikage's death when Hakuren walks by Teito in the church. Teito mistakes him for Mikage since they look somewhat similar, but upon looking closer, realizes it is someone else. Teito then realizes that he is Shuri Oak's brother. Upon seeing that Teito is training to become a bishop a well, he states that Teito is now his rival. Teito thinks there is something about Hakuren that is familiar to him until Hakuren asks Teito whether middle school children were starting to take the exam as well. Teito suddenly realizes that Hakuren sounds a lot like Shuri Oak, his tormentor from the military academy. Eventually, they apologize for being so rude to each other and become friends. After passing the bishop exam, he became Castor's apprentice. Hakuren was ranked fifth in the latest popularity poll in Monthly Comic Zero Sum.
Ayanami (アヤナミ)
Voiced by: Shō Hayami
The main antagonist, he is the man who killed Teito's Father in the war against Raggs and seeks the Eye of Mikhail. Later in the manga, a picture of the Raggs royal family is shown, revealing that Ayanami is Teito's uncle. Because of his birth, some colleagues dislike him and constantly give him a hard time. On the surface he is respected, as he is greeted by salutes by officers whose ranks are lower than his, but some officers talk about Ayanami disrespectfully behind his back as well. In one chapter in the manga, when the Barsburg officers hear that Ayanami is leading 500 soldiers to Antwort to reinforce them, they say that the Black Hawks (Ayanami and his personal subordinates) are monsters and they do not want to fight with them. He is also the reincarnated Verloren.
Mikage (ミカゲ, Mikage)
Voiced by: Daisuke Namikawa
Teito's best friend, Mikage comes from a family of stewards. Despite the fact that his closeness with Teito makes him a target of some students' ill will in the academy, he remains a bright and cheerful person. His relationship with Teito involves a lot of Mikage teasing Teito, Teito beating him up in return, and his urging Teito to eat more. The two are very close, promising each other that they will die together and will always be "the best of friends". Mikage also teaches Teito about meeting friends and having compassion. After learning of Castor's family's grief for their son, he tells Seilan, "Mikage had told me... that if two people were together, sadness would also be halved..."
Mikage is killed, but later reincarnated as a small, furry, pink dragon. Frau explains that it's because he wished to protect Teito, no matter the form. Mikage is easily recognizable by the small, X-shaped scar on his chin; he got it a long time ago when he was sparring with his older brother. Burupya has a similar scar on his head. He ranked third in the latest popularity poll in Monthly Comic Zero Sum.
Ouida
Voiced by: Romi Park
He helped Teito in the Bishop Exam by giving him some of his Zaiphon. He has a younger brother named Liam.

== Media ==
=== Manga ===
Written and illustrated by Yuki Amemiya and Yukino Ichihara, 07-Ghost was serialized in Ichijinsha's josei manga magazine Monthly Comic Zero Sum. Its first installment was published in the magazine's June 2005 issue. (Note: It started in the magazine's sixth issue of 2005 (cover date June 1),) The series finished its final installment in the October 2013 issue of Monthly Comic Zero Sum, published on August 28, 2013. (Note: It ended in the magazine's tenth issue of 2013 (cover date October 1), released on August 28 of that same year.) Ichijinsha collected its chapters in Seventeen tankōbon volumes, released from November 25, 2005, to September 25, 2013. Ichijinsha republished the series in nine bunkoban volumes from July 25, 2015, to March 25, 2016.

The manga was licensed in North America by Go!Comi, who published the first few volumes before they stopped publishing in October 2009. Viz Media has since licensed the series; the first volume of their version of the series was released 13 November 2012. The manga has also been licensed in France by Kazé.

=== Drama CD ===
The first drama CD, Kamisama ni Todoku Koibumi, was released in 2007. It features many of the same voice actors that will be reprising their roles for the anime. A second drama CD was released in February 2009 entitled "The Day of Retribution". The second drama CD features the same voice cast for the previous CD and the anime, and a bonus track of the cast's comments and a specially drawn cover by the manga artist. In October the same year, another drama CD was released, titled "The Top News Headlines". Another drama CD was released in 2009. Limited edition DVDs have been released since autumn 2009. Thirteen mini-dramas are included in these DVDs. The first mini-drama features Teito and Mikage, the second Teito and Frau, the third Teito and Ayanami, the fourth Teito and Hakuren, the fifth Hyuuga and Konatsu, the sixth Castor and Labrador, the seventh Kuroyuri and Haruse, the eighth Frau and Castor, the ninth Katsuragi and Konatsu, the tenth Frau and Razette, the eleventh King Kromm and his brother, the twelfth Hakuren and Shuri, the thirteenth Teito and Buryupa.

=== Anime ===
07-Ghost has been adapted into an anime by Studio Deen. Directed by Yoshihiro Takamoto, the anime premiered on Chiba TV on 7 April 2009, and ran for 25 episodes until 22 September 2009. Two pieces of theme music are used; Aka no Kakera by Yuki Suzuki is the opening theme, while Hitomi no Kotae by Noria is the ending theme. The song "Raggs no Chinkonka" by Noria is used as an insert song in episodes 20 and 25. The anime has been licensed by Discotek Media.

== Reception ==
The seventh volume of 07-Ghost was ranked 23rd on the Tohan charts between 26 November and 2 December 2008. Sakura Eries from Mania.com comments that the manga contains "supernatural shōnen action title with a complex plot" and "emotional moments between Teito and Mikage" for shōjo readers. The 9th Volume was ranked 13th on Oricon Manga Ranking charts between 23 and 29 November. The 10th Volume debuted at number 10 on Oricon Manga Ranking charts. By July 2013, the manga had over 3 million copies in circulation.
