= Xpark =

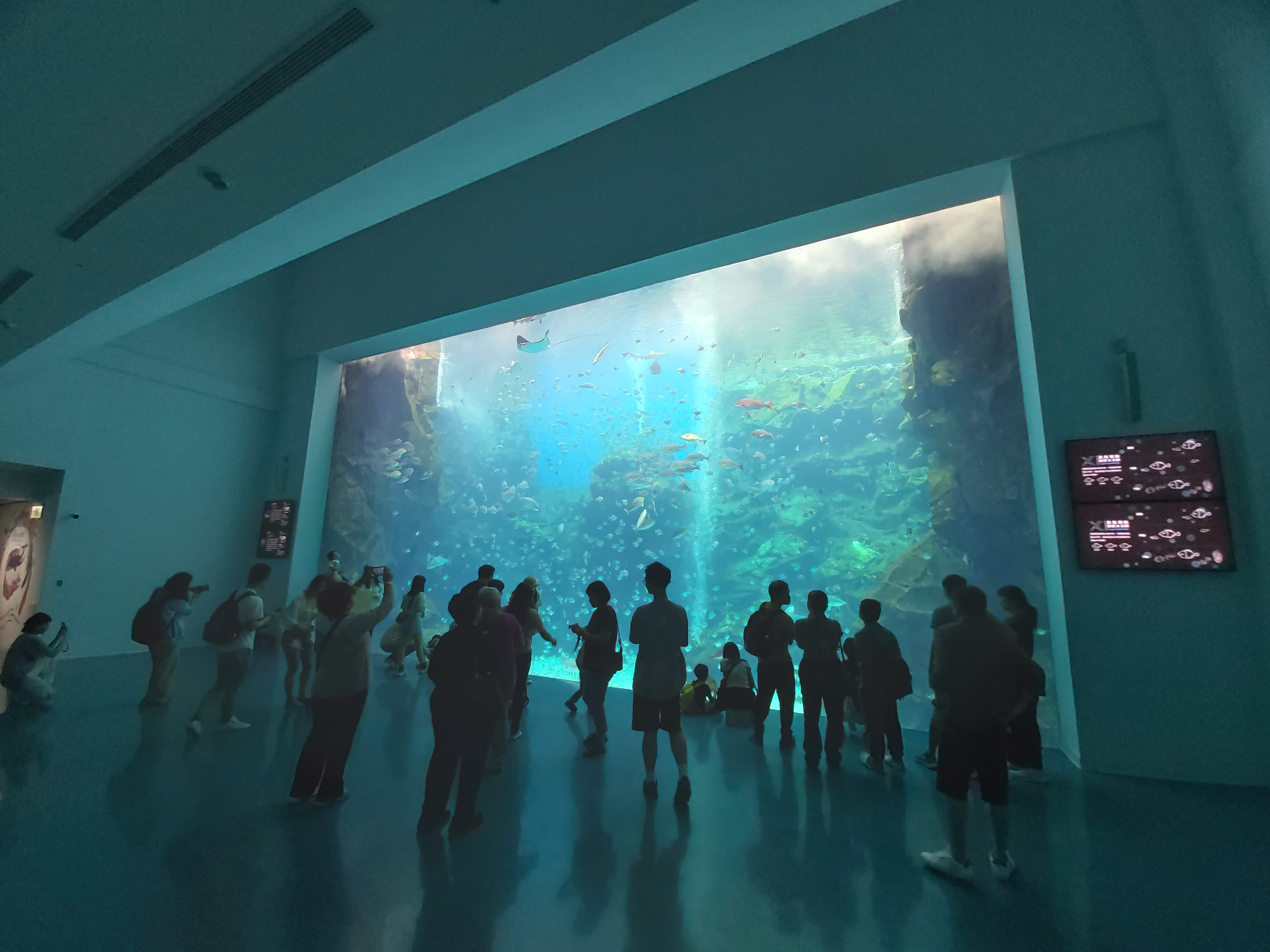
- The Xpark
- Interactive map of Xpark
- 25.0172°N 121.2141°E
- Date opened: August 7, 2020
- Location: Landmark Plaza, Taoyuan, Taiwan
- Land area: 14,817 m^{2} (159,490 sq ft)
- No. of animals: 3,000
- No. of species: 300
- Volume of largest tank: 1,000,000 litres (264,000 US gal)
- Total volume of tanks: 2,300,000 litres (608,000 US gal)
- Major exhibits: Formosa tank area(福爾摩沙)
- Management: Yokohama Hakkeijima (台灣橫浜八景島股份有限公司)
- Website: www.xpark.com.tw

The Xpark is a public aquarium located on the first three floors of Landmark Plaza in Taoyuan, Taiwan.

== History ==
The aquarium is operated by the Taiwanese branch of Yokohama Hakkeijima and opened on August 7, 2020.

In 2022, the aquarium participated in the "Environmental Education Theme Exhibition" organized by the Taoyuan City Environmental Protection Bureau. In April 2023, Xpark supported National Geographic's Animal Ark project.

In 2023, Xpark and the Taoyuan City Government established the Sea Turtle Conservation Center.

Xpark Aquarium and Yokohama Hakkeijima Taiwan Ltd. received an award from President Tsai Ing-wen of the Taiwan Central Government at the "Taiwan Investment Summit 2023 (2023 Taiwan Business Alliance Conference)" organized by the Ministry of Economic Affairs on November 27, and an award from Vice President Lai Ching-te at the "Marine Animal Rescue Network (MARN)" event held on December 1.

== Research and conservation ==
The aquarium places great emphasis on protecting sea turtles.

Taoyuan Mayor Zhang Shanzheng said that according to historical data, an average of one to two sea turtles are stranded for unknown reasons each month on Taoyuan's beaches, requiring urgent treatment.

In cases previously sent to Xpark for treatment, initial examination and recovery often revealed that the sea turtles contained plastic debris, fish hooks, and other marine debris in their bodies and excrement, highlighting the marine problem in Taoyuan City.

In response, Xpark and the Taoyuan City Government established and opened the Sea Turtle Conservation Center. The Turtle Conservation Center will be responsible for marine conservation and education, emergency medical rescue of marine life, and cooperation in the protection of Taiwan's marine environment and life.

== Gallery ==
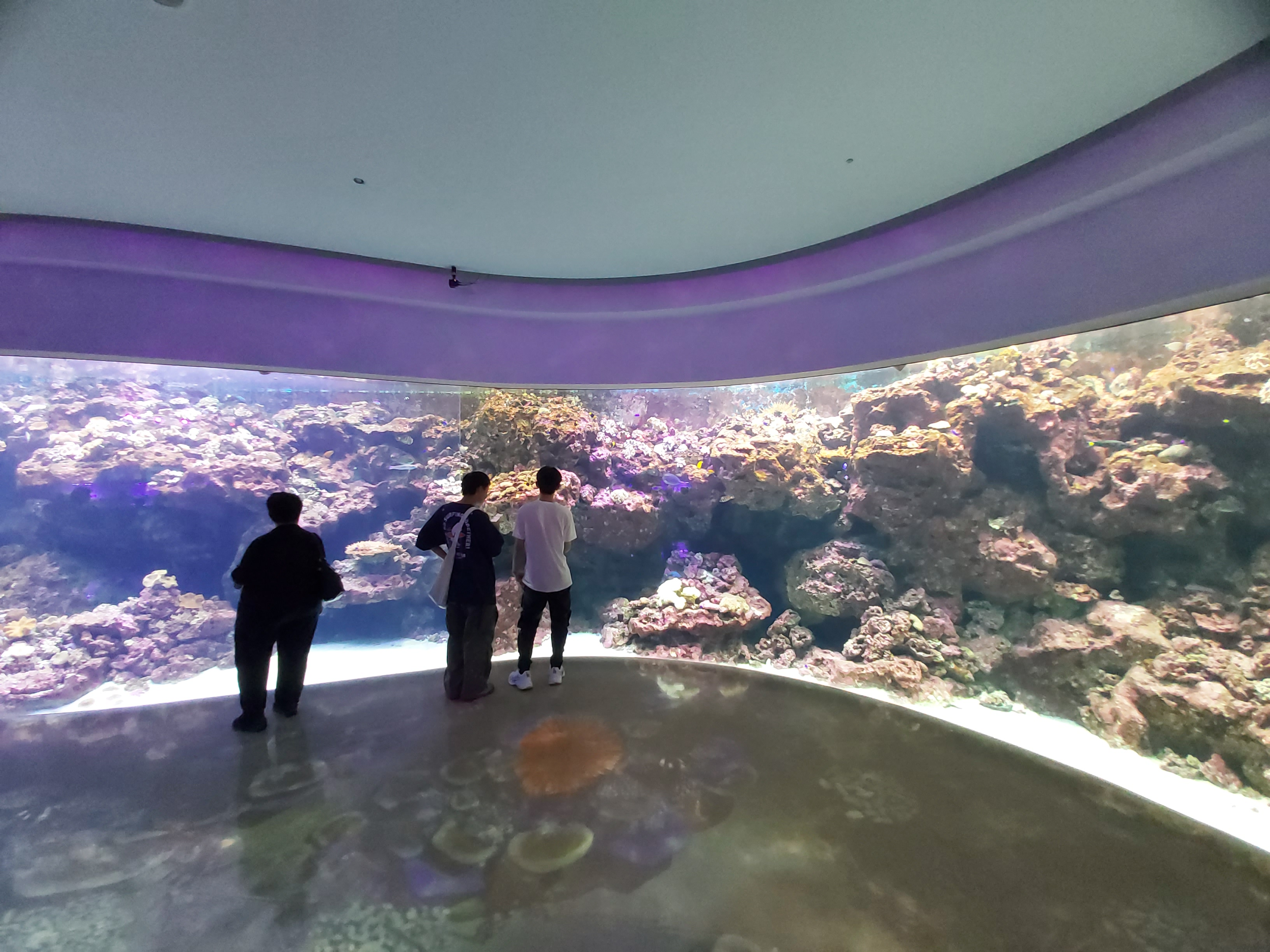

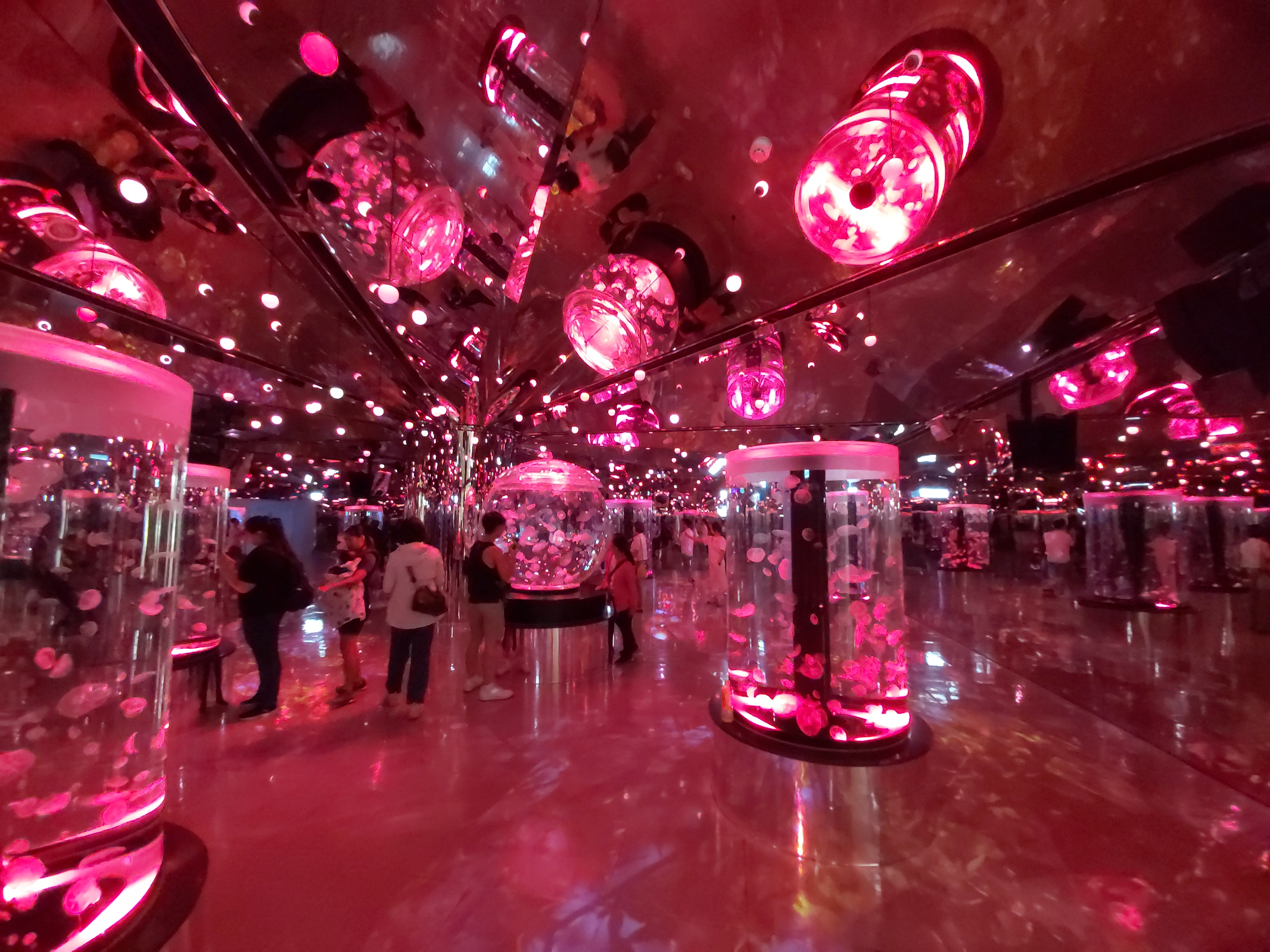

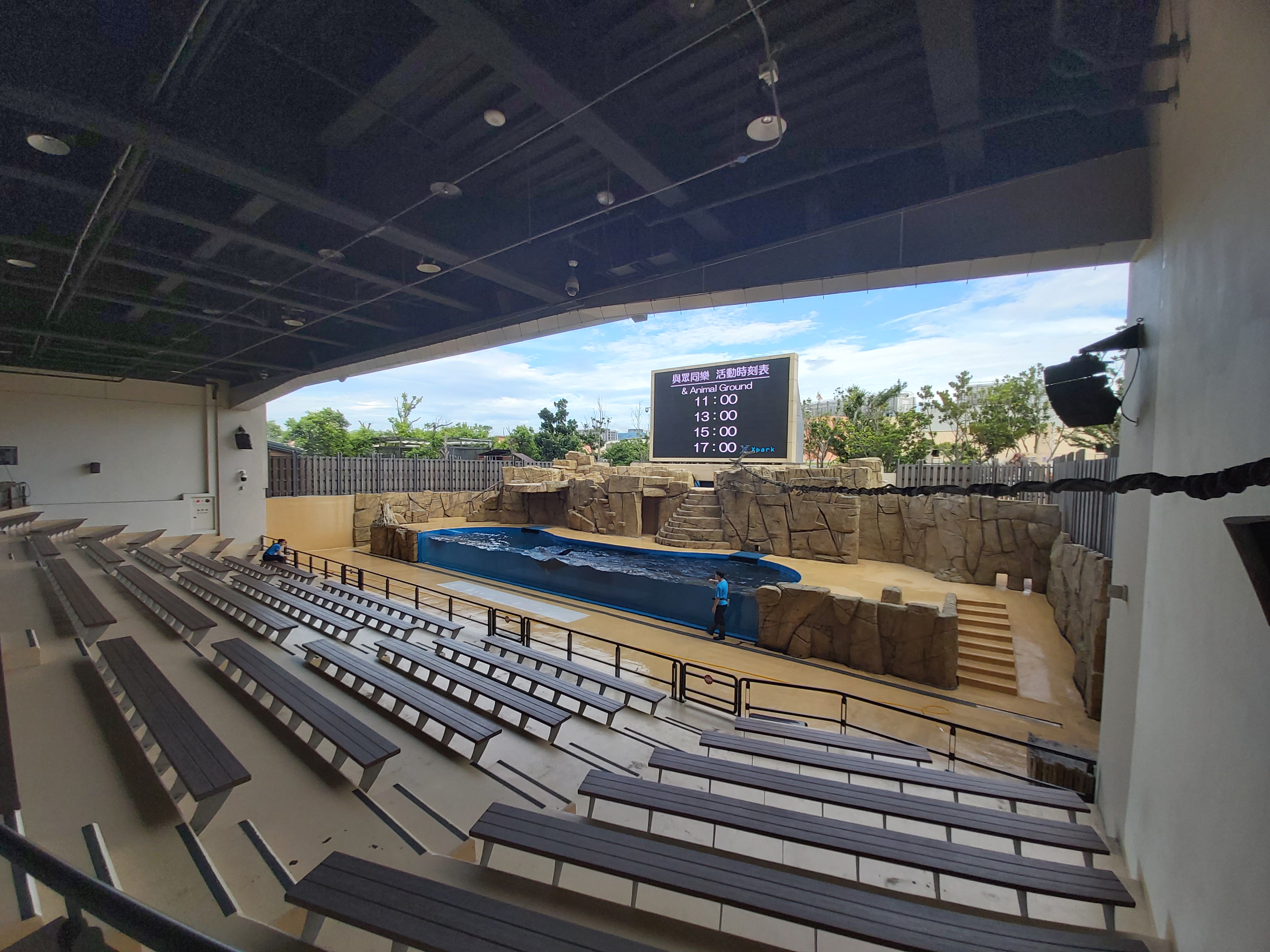

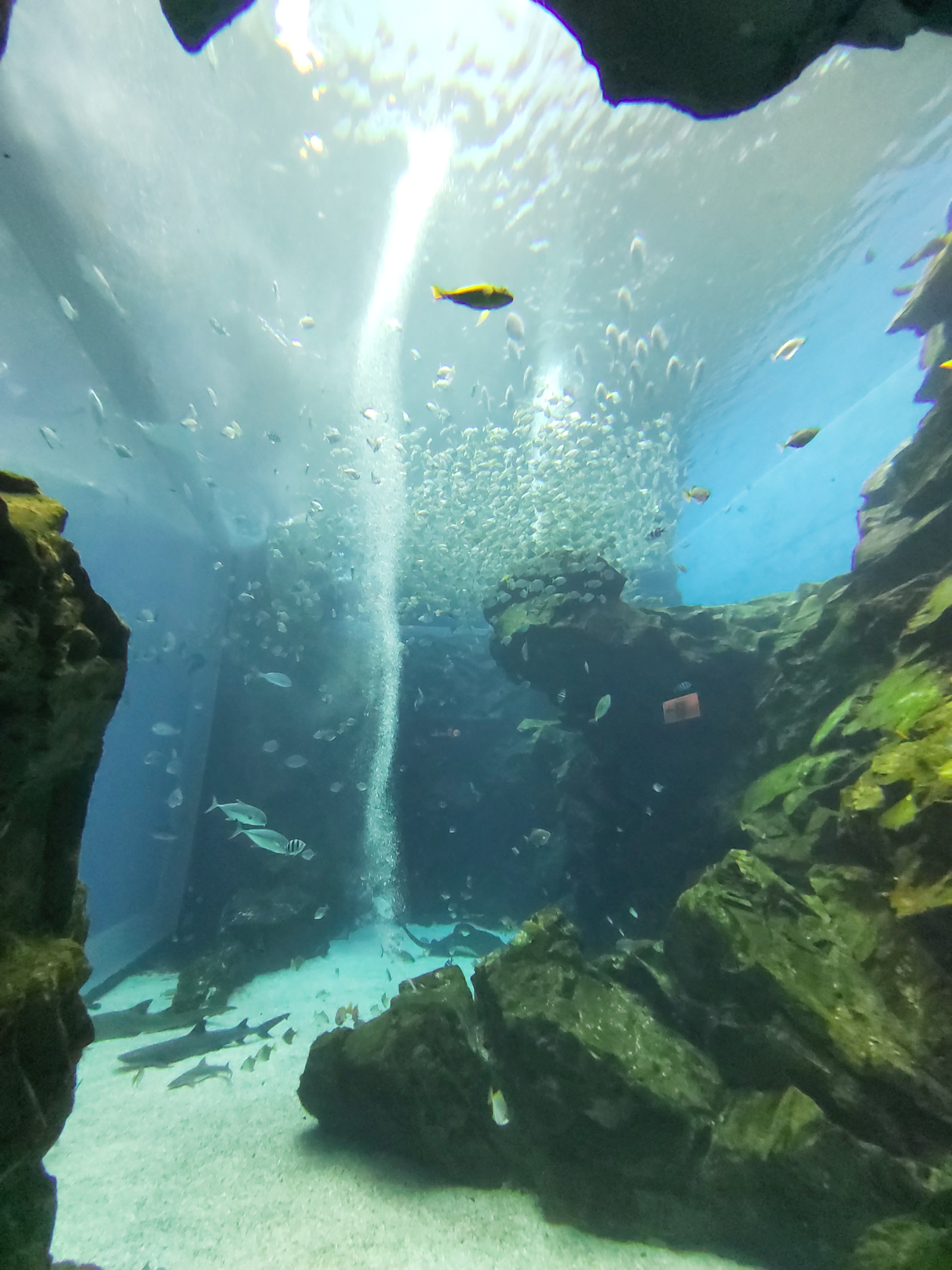

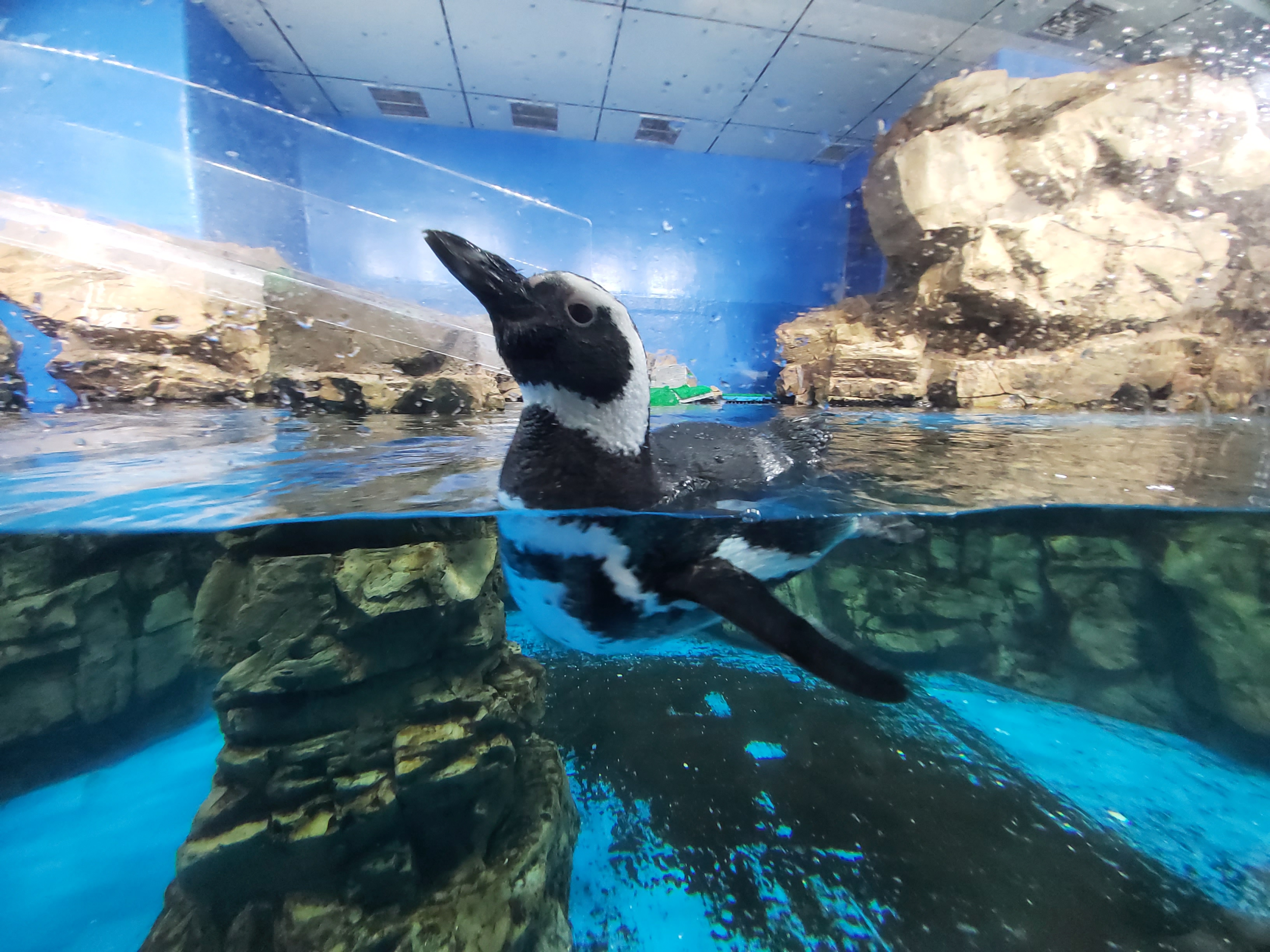

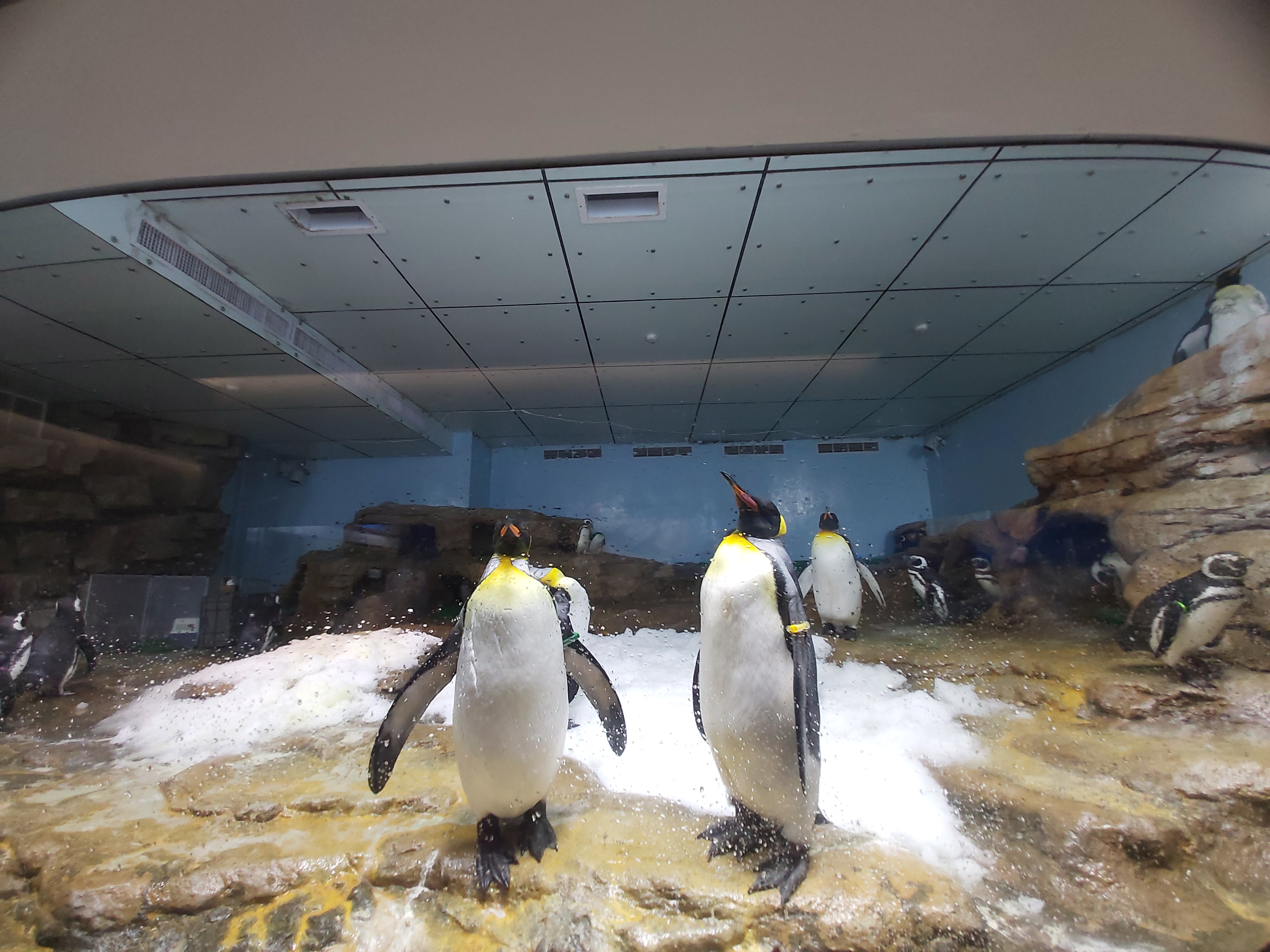

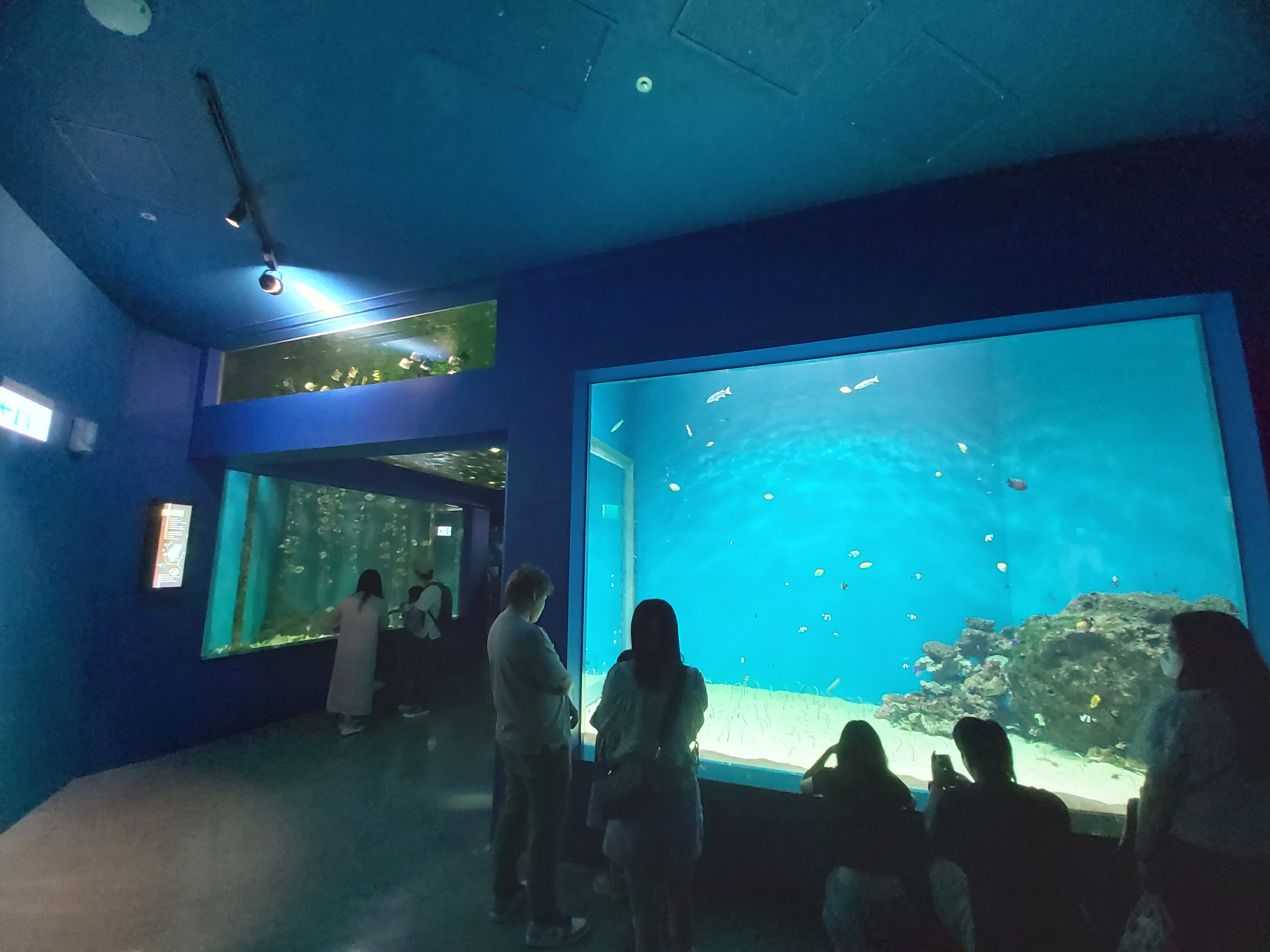

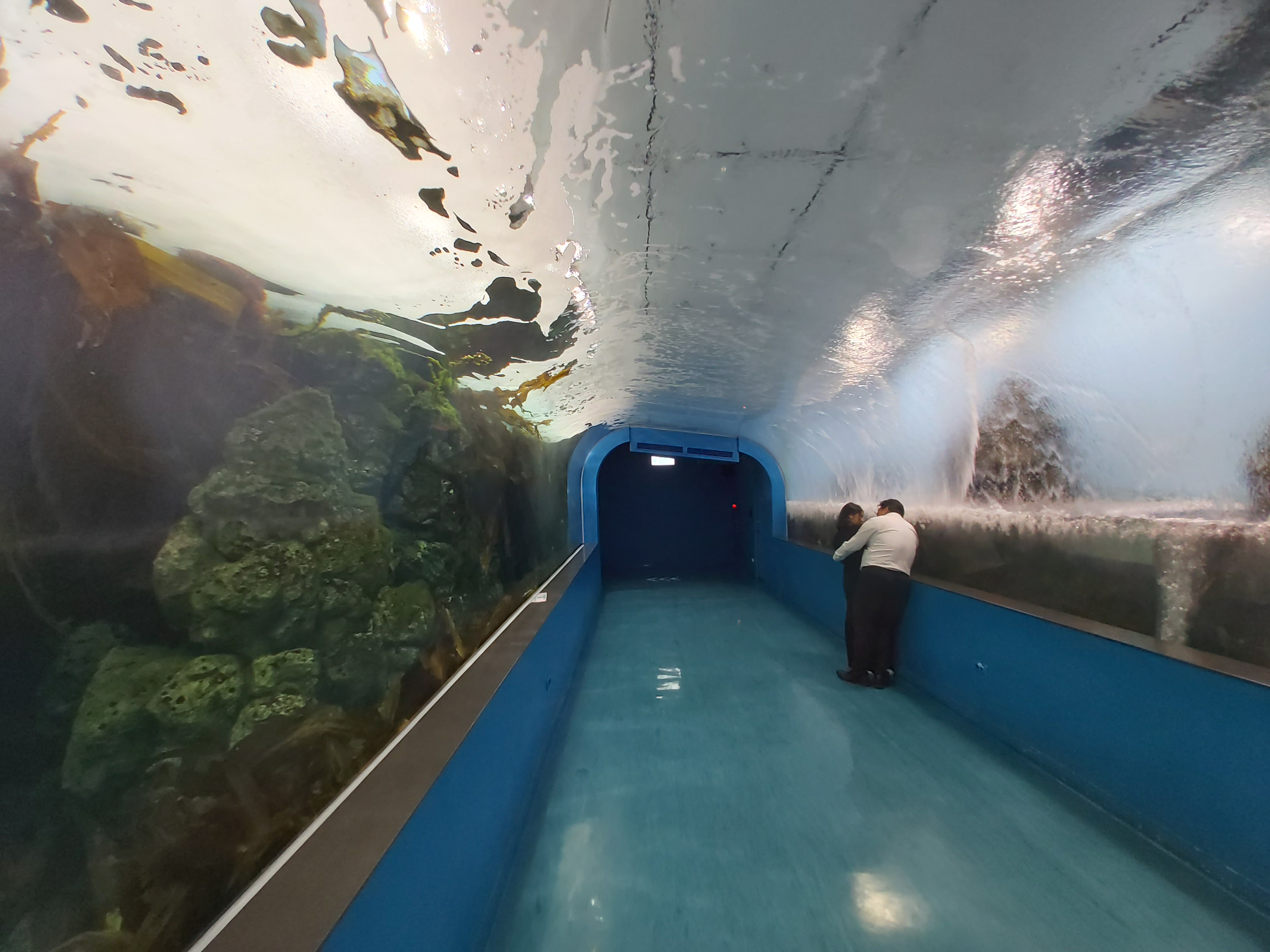

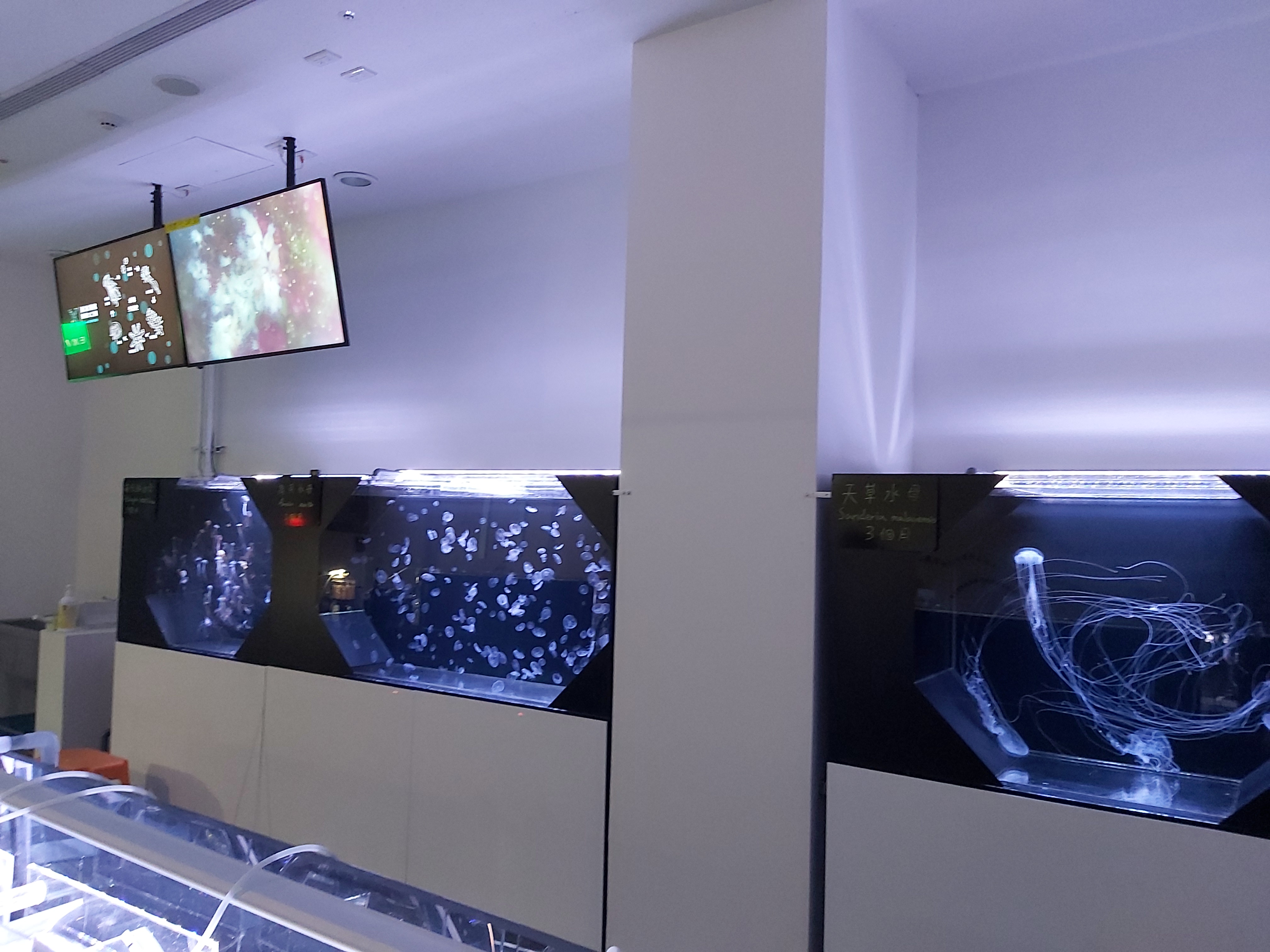

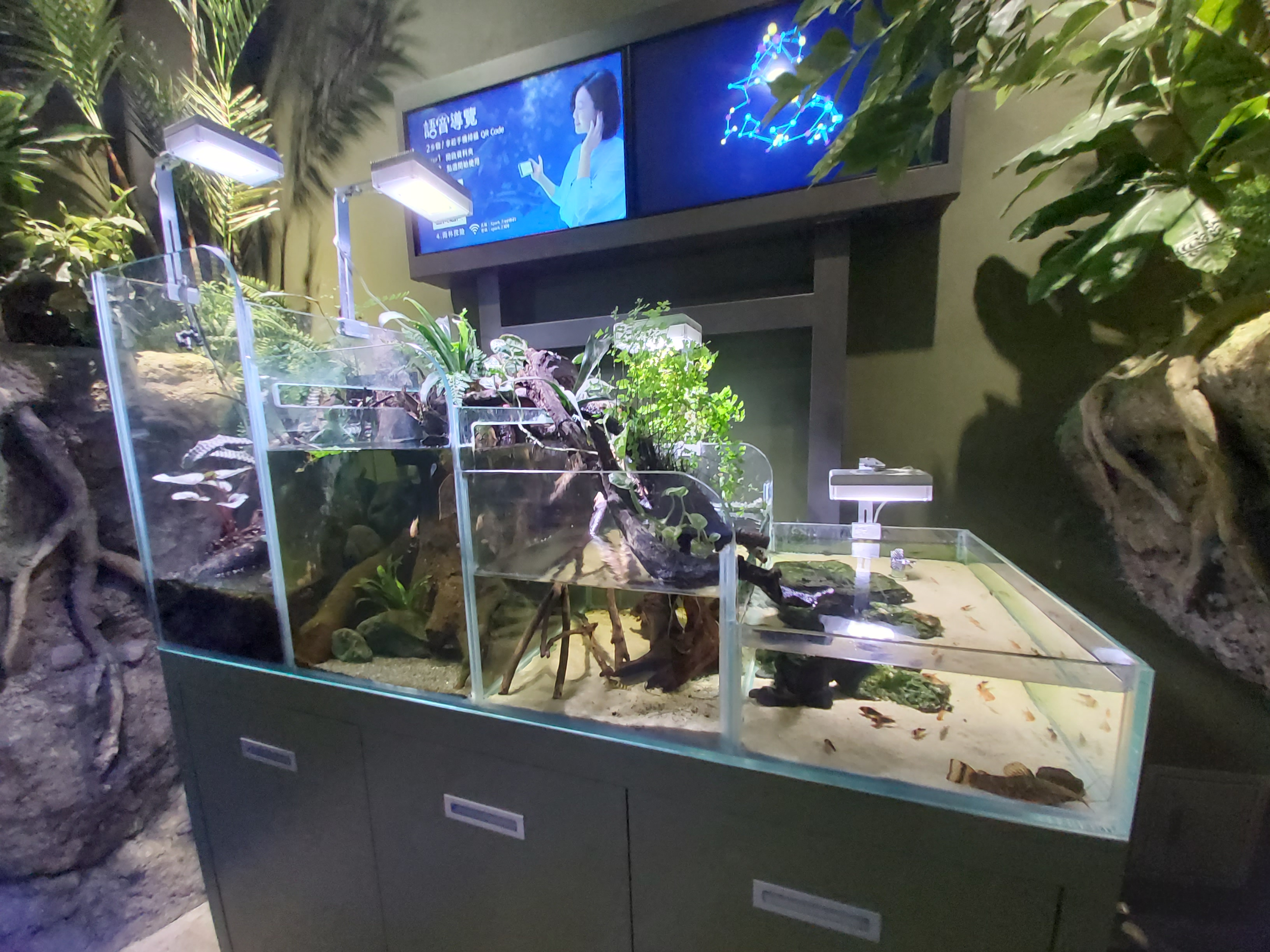

== See also ==
- Facilities with the same Management
  - Yokohama Hakkeijima Sea Paradise
  - Sendai Umino-Mori Aquarium
  - Joetsu Aquarium
  - Itabashi Botanical Garden
