= Yokohama Hakkeijima Sea Paradise =

Amusement complex in Japan

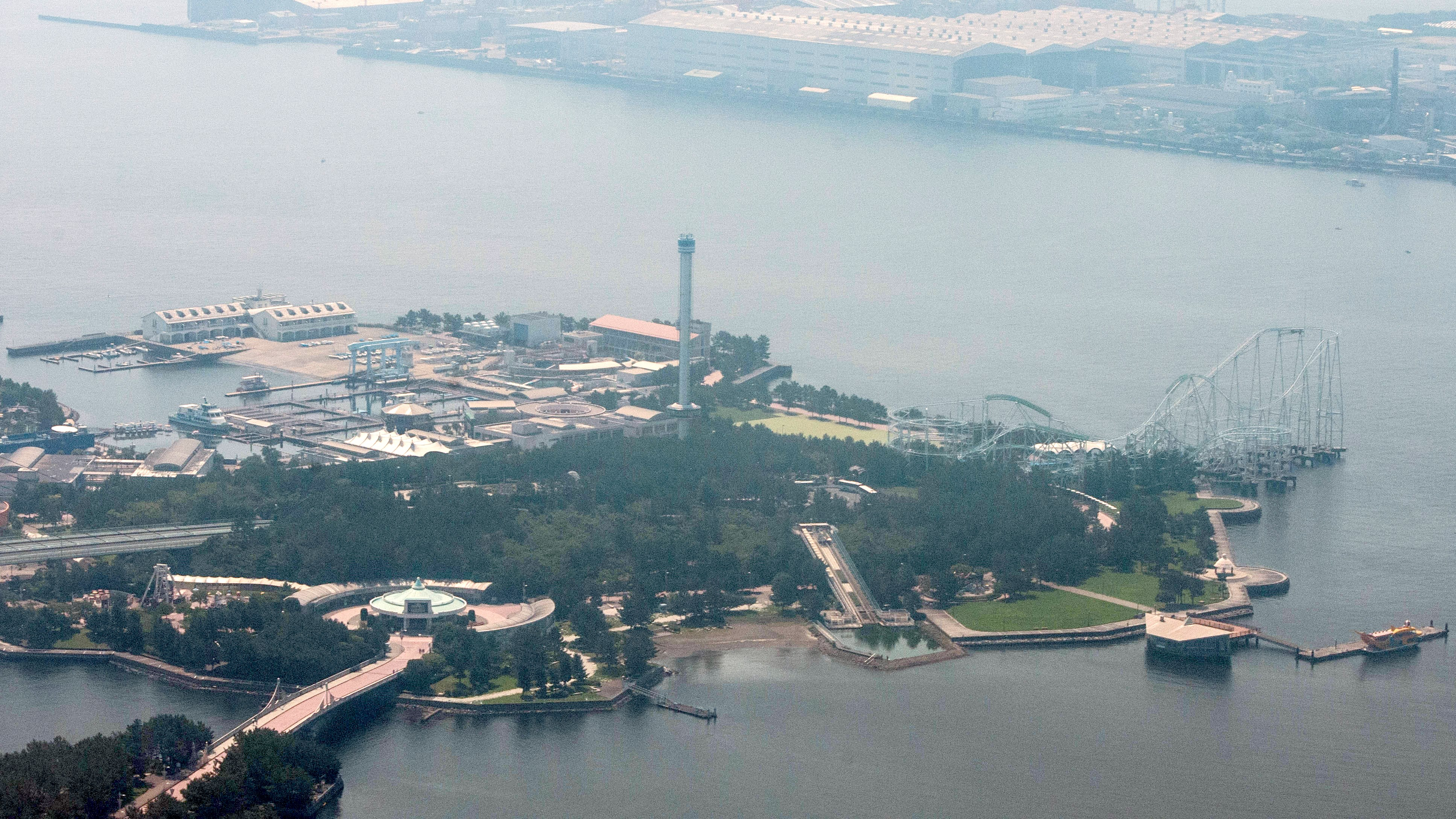
- Yokohama Hakkeijima Sea Paradise in 2015
- Interactive map of Yokohama Hakkeijima Sea Paradise
- Location: Yokohama, Kanagawa, Japan
- Coordinates: 35°20′14.79″N 139°38′50.4″E
- Status: Operating
- Opened: May 1993
- Area: 16.3 ha (40 acres)
- Website: www.seaparadise.co.jp

Yokohama Hakkeijima Sea Paradise (横浜・八景島シーパラダイス, Yokohama Hakkeijima Shīparadaisu) is an amusement park consisting of an aquarium, shopping mall, hotel, marina and amusement rides. It is located in Hakkeijima, Kanazawa-ku, Yokohama, Kanagawa, Japan. It opened on May 8, 1993.

It is a pay-as-you-go theme park, having no gates or admission charges. Visitors have the option of buying a day pass or paying for each attraction separately. With 4,770,000 visitors in 2007, it ranks sixth among Asian amusement parks in terms of attendance.

== Aqua Resorts ==
Yokohama Hakkeijima Sea Paradise Aqua Resorts
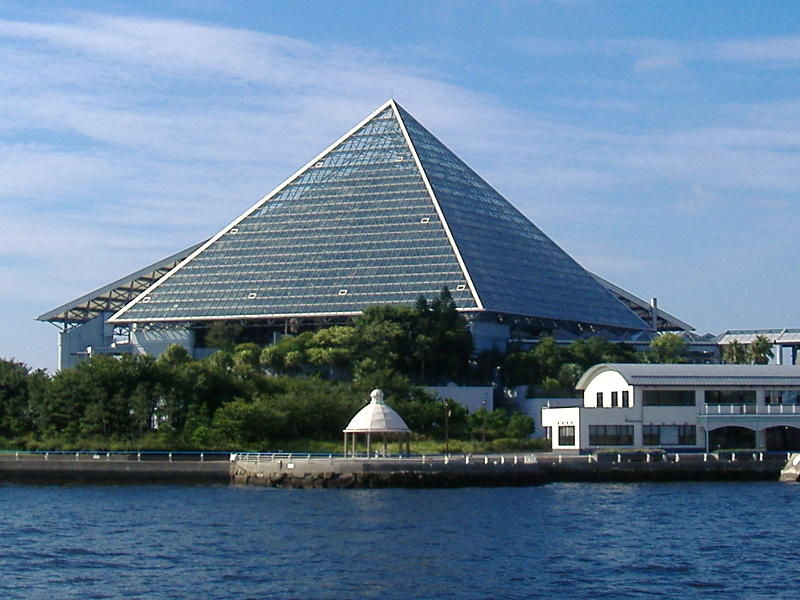
- Aqua Museum
- Interactive map of Yokohama Hakkeijima Sea Paradise Aqua Resorts
- Date opened: May 1993
- No. of animals: 120,000
- No. of species: 700
- Total volume of tanks: 16,800,000 litres (4,438,000 US gal) (Total of 4 facilities)
- Memberships: JAZA
- Major exhibits: Aqua Museum; Dolphin Fantasy; Fureai Lagoon; Umi Farm
- Management: Yokohama Hakkeijima
- Website: https://www.seaparadise.co.jp/en/web_reserve/

Aqua Resorts is a public aquarium located in Yokohama Hakkeijima Sea Paradise, consisting of four facilities. The aquarium is accredited as a museum-equivalent facility by the Museum Act from the Ministry of Education, Culture, Sports, Science and Technology.

=== Aqua Museum ===
The Aqua Museum is an aquarium with a pyramid-like appearance. There are five floors, with exhibits on the first, third, and fourth floors, and the Aqua Theater located on the fifth floor. The second floor is not open to the general public.

Whale sharks began to be housed at the aquarium on October 5, 2010. Aqua Resorts was the first facility in eastern Japan to house whale sharks. Since their last whale shark died in 2019, they have not been exhibited since.

=== Aqua stadium ===
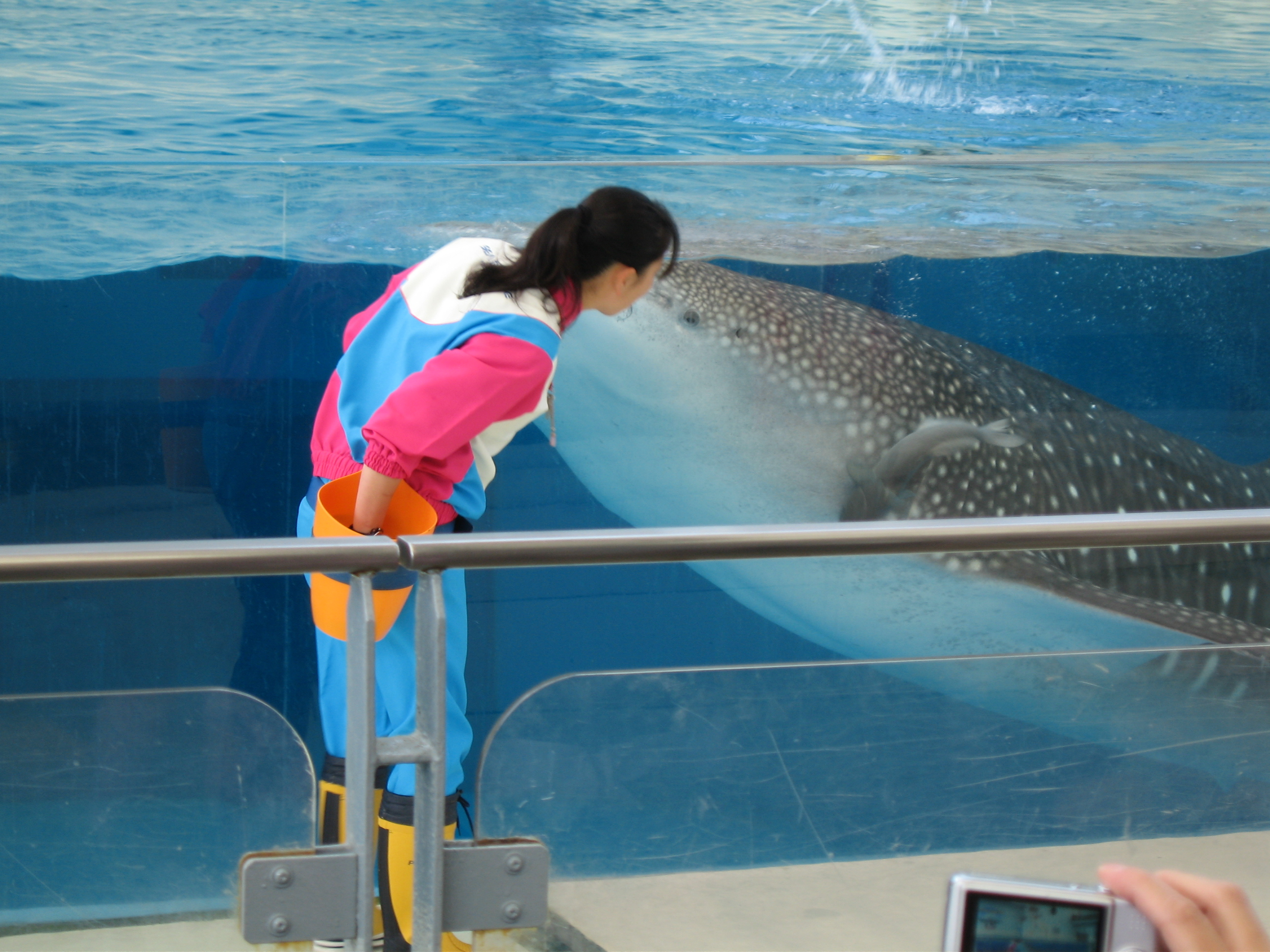
The aquarium has kept three whale sharks so far.

The Aqua stadium consists of five outdoor water tanks, an ecology show pool, two research pools, a breeding pool, and a treatment pool. It also features the Sea Video Museum/Aqua Theater, a 720-inch digital hi-vision theater with 130 seats.

=== Dolphin fantasy ===
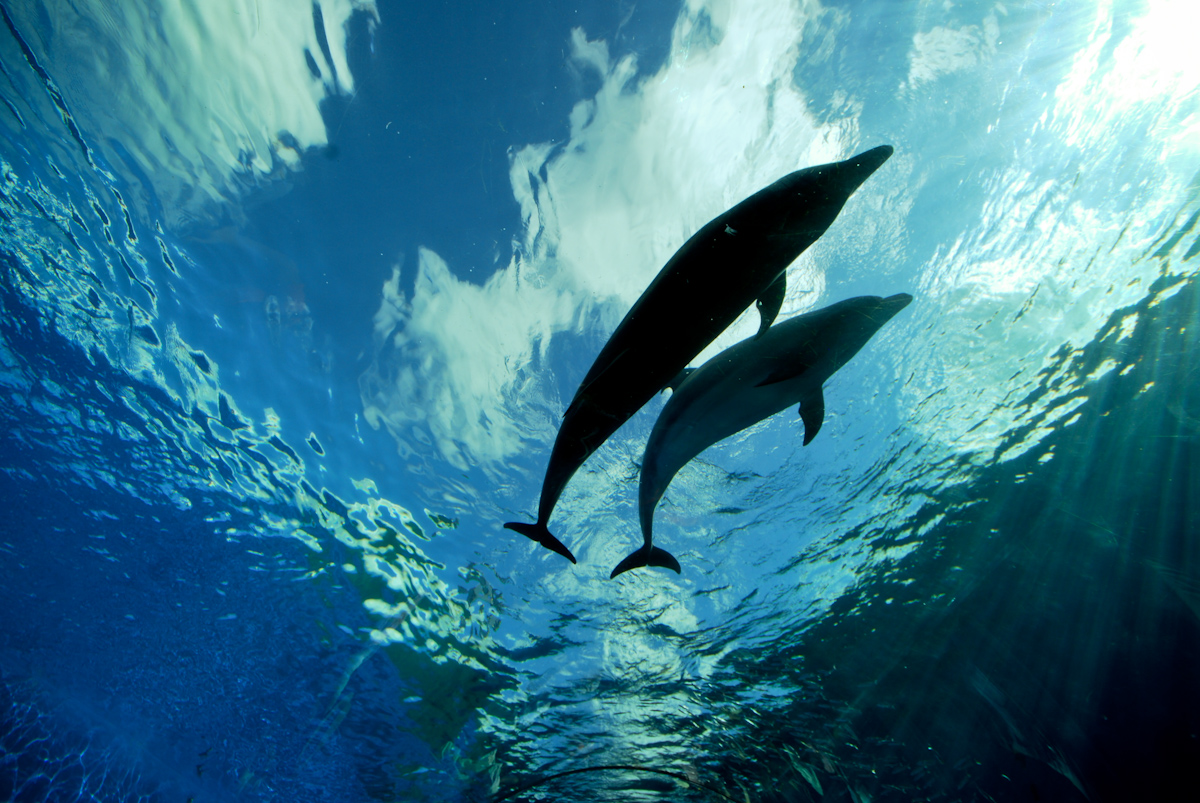
Dolphin Fantasy

An aquarium housing dolphins and ocean sunfish. It opened on July 16, 2004, and consists of a tunnel-shaped water tank and a cylindrical water tank.

=== Fureai Lagoon ===
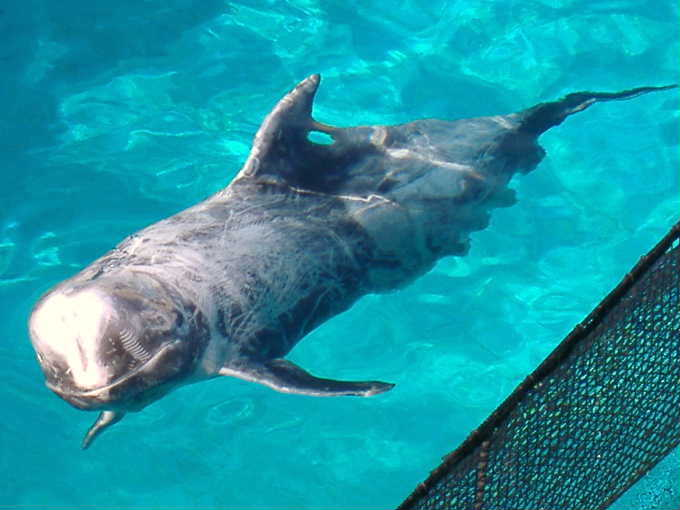
A Risso's dolphin at Fureai Lagoon. On September 5, 1998, a female Risso's dolphin gave birth for the first time in 35 years in Japan.

The Fureai Lagoon opened on July 27, 2007. The edge of this aquarium is designed to be low, so that guests can observe the marine life on display up close.

=== Umi Farm ===
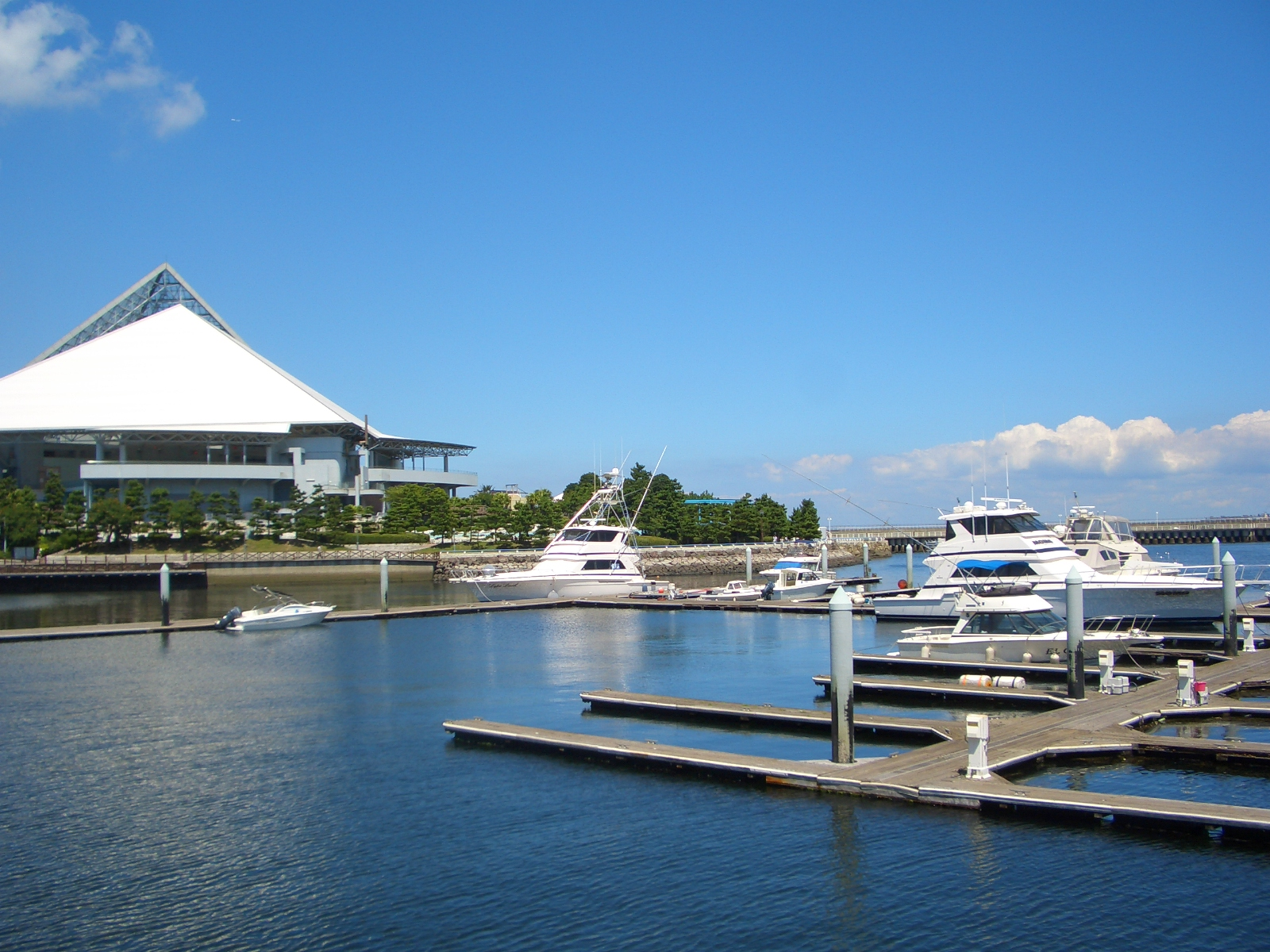
Panoramio

The Umi Farm opened on March 8, 2013, and is an aquarium where guests can learn about the sea by observing fish and seaweed. There are two areas, Food Education Zone and Ocean Lab.

== Research and conservation ==
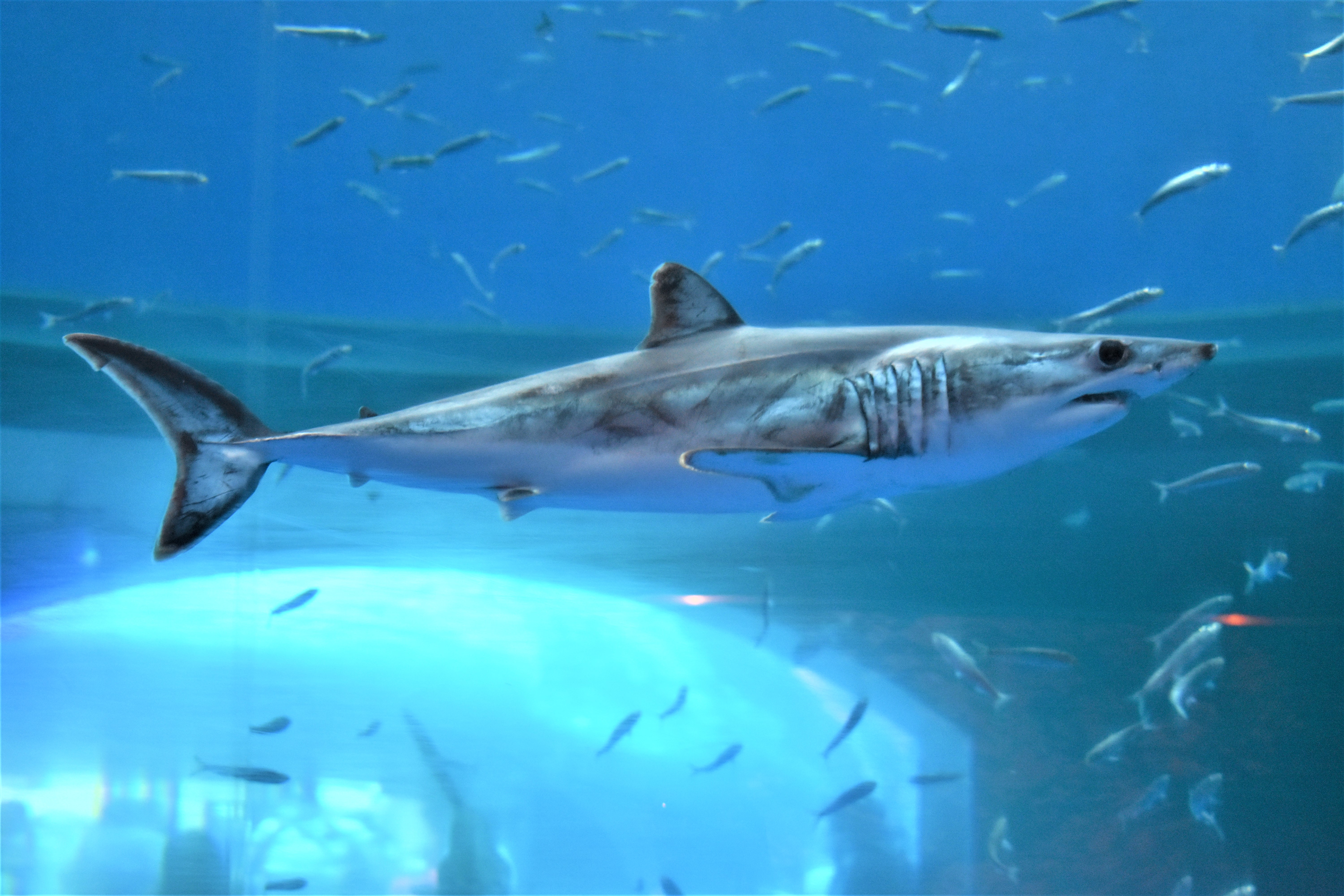
In the past, the aquarium has housed shortfin mako sharks, goblin sharks, and smalltooth sand tigers.

The aquarium is working on breeding sharks and rays that are difficult to keep in captivity, working with Marine World Uminonakamichi, Aqua World, Noboribetsu Marine Park Nixe, Marine Science Center, Social Education Center, and Tokai University. In 2015, the aquarium established the Sand tiger shark Breeding Council, which aims to share information on the artificial birth and active breeding of the species.

In 2016, the fertilized eggs of frill sharks were displayed.

The aquarium introduced the JELLYFISHBOT, a garbage collection drone, in 2021.

In 2022, the aquarium opened the Mijikana Marine Life Institute, in collaboration with the Tokyo University.

== Attractions ==
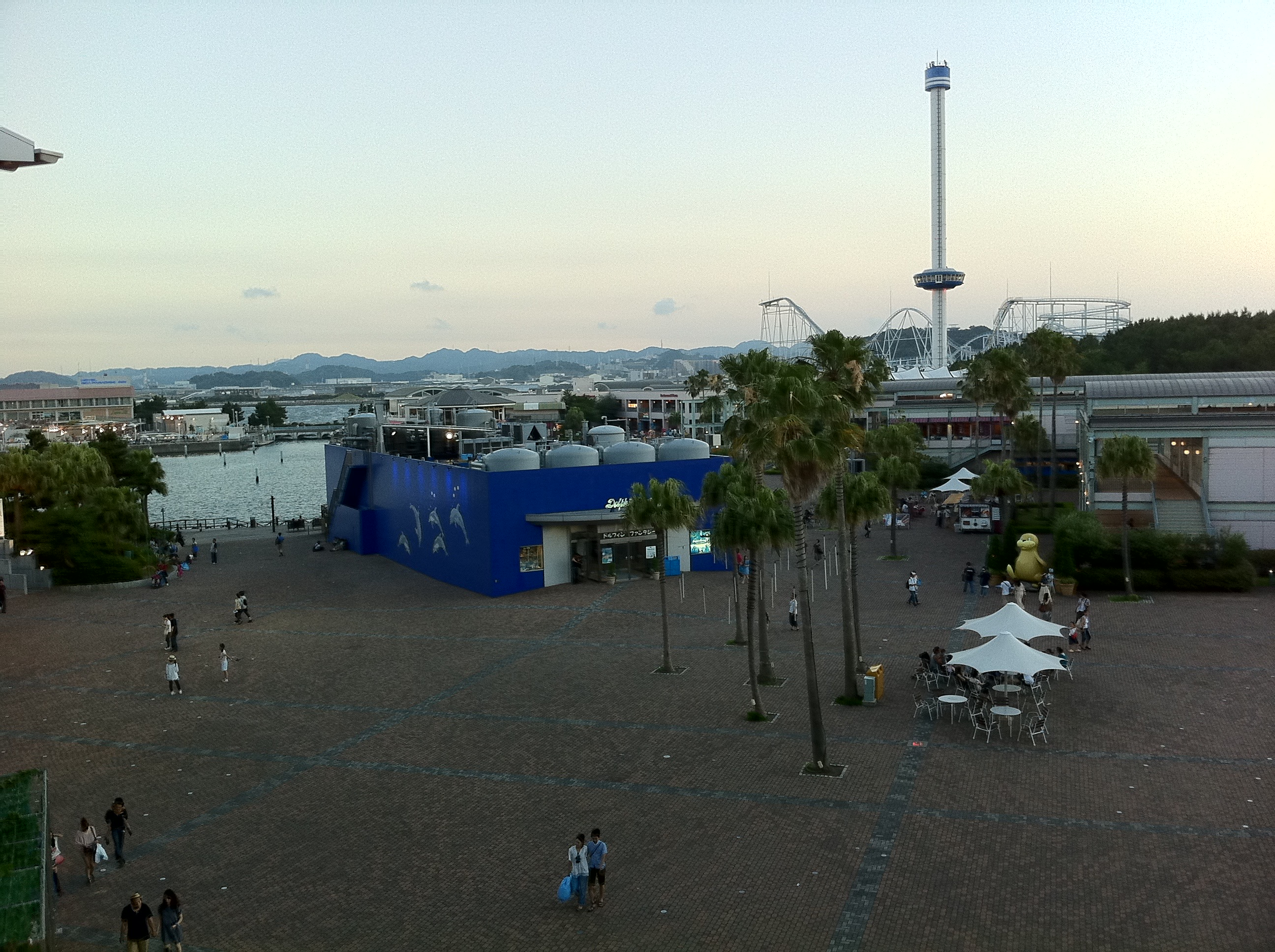
Attractions at Yokohama Hakkeijima Sea Paradise

Many of the park's attractions have a marine motif.

=== Height-restricted attractions ===
120 cm or more

- Surf Coaster Leviathan
- Marine Cart Fantasia

110 cm or more

- Aqua Ride II ~ Treasure Hunting Adventure ~

95 cm or more

- Flight Eagle
- Butterflyder

=== Attractions with no height restrictions ===
- Blue Sky Climbing ROCKN ROCK
- Giant Three-dimensional Maze Dekkai
- Sea Boat - a boat-type attraction that allows guests to drive in the natural sea next to the Umi Farm.
- Sea Paradise Tower
- Merry-go-round
- Bubble Shooting
- Red Baron
- Sea Train
- Pleasure Boat Paradise Cruise

=== Attractions that cost extra ===
- Play
- Treasure Stone Park

=== Arcade ===
- Carnival House

=== Former attractions ===
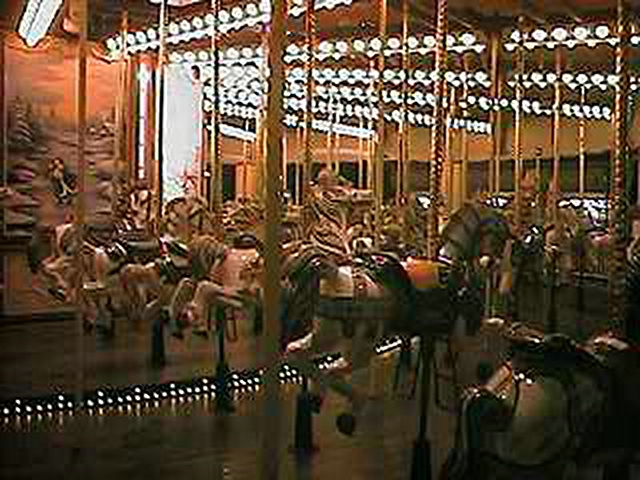
Merry-go-round

- Blue Fall
- Dolphin Coaster
- Water Shoot
- Splashute
- Octopus
- Drunken Barrel
- Peter Pan
- Kids Adventure
- Heaven and Hell
- Golden Treasure Hunt, Pirate Legend, Cursed Skeleton Island
- Sea Para Walk Rally "Sea Para Detectives"
- Kids Pirates
- Waku Waku Kids Park
- Mini Express
- Seabo
- Golden treasure hunt, LAST PANIC
- Ice Country
- Hospital Enthusiast, hunt for treasure on Glitter Island
- Triple 3 Mission
- Mirror Maze
- Sea Para Kids Town

== Adjacent facilities ==
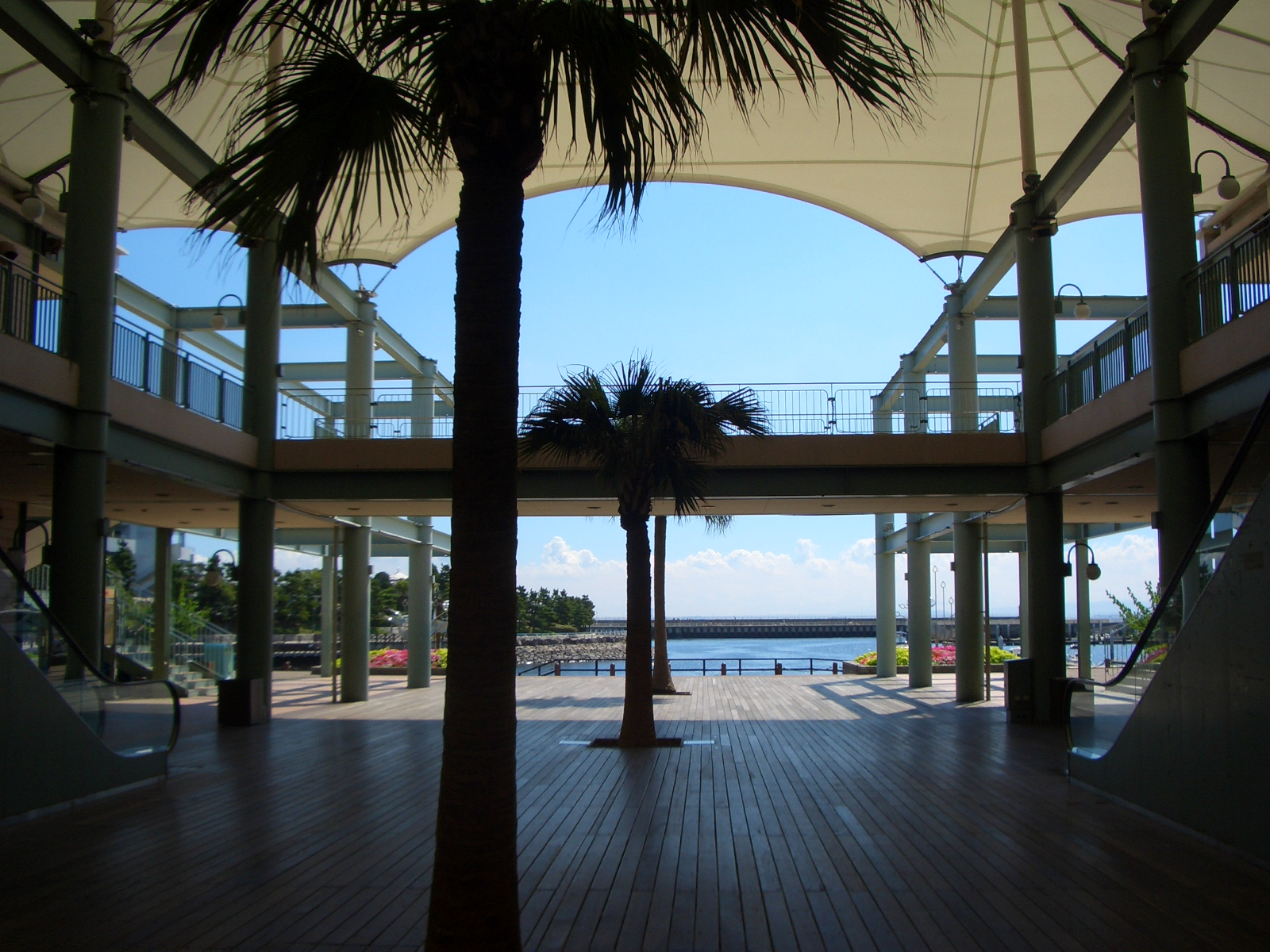
The sea seen from inside the Hotel Sea Paradise Inn.

=== Restaurants and shops ===
- Seafood＆Grill YAKIYA
- Hawaiian Cafe & Restaurant Merengue
- La Tarafuku
- Booze Cafe
- Shiosai Cuisine Yasuke
- CLASSIC
- Manjare
- Breeze
- Seaside Oasis
- Dolphin
- Cable Car Coffee
- Marion Crepe
- Kobara Cafe
- Toge Dairy Industry 63 °C
- Jinbei SHOP
- Aqua Museum Shop
- Big Wave
- Frendia
- Delphis
- Shell Garden
- Mihama Beach Girl
- Souvenir Shop Kofuku
- M Cabin
- Fresh Loose
- Sea Paradise Dice Food Museum
- Puku Puku Island
- Banana Moon
- Ocean Club
- YY SHOP
- MIRAI Building
- LAHAINA CREWS
- Aqua Blue
- Fantasy Shop

=== Hotels ===
- Hotel Sea Paradise Inn

== Incidents ==
- Approximately 90 deep-sea fish and marine life died while being transferred from an outside laboratory to Yokohama Hakkeijima Sea Paradise. The cause of death appeared to be a rise in water temperature due to a mechanical failure. The incident received heavy criticism from animal rights groups.
- In 2019, a whale shark died within two months of the aquarium having acquired the shark.

== In popular culture ==
Yokohama Hakkeijima Sea Paradise is seen in the 2002 film Godzilla Against Mechagodzilla, in which the amusement park is destroyed by Godzilla. The film showed guests escaping safely before its destruction.

== Yokohama Hakkeijima Inc. ==
Yokohama Hakkeijima Inc. was started by nine companies in March 1988, centered on Seibu Group and Prince Hotels. Yokohama City created an artificial island, Hakkeijima, and rented part of the island to Yokohama Hakkeijima Co. Ltd., which commenced operations on May 8, 1993.

Yokohama Hakkeijima is a Seibu Group company, and also operates and manages:

Name	Year of opening	Location	website
Yokohama Hakkeijima Sea Paradise Aqua Resorts	1993	Yokohama, Kanagawa	www.seaparadise.co.jp
Maxell Aqua Park Shinagawa	2005	Shinagawa Prince Hotel, Minato, Tokyo	www.aqua-park.jp/aqua/
Sendai Umino-Mori Aquarium	2015	Sendai, Miyagi	www.uminomori.jp/umino/
Itabashi Botanical Garden	1994	Itabashi, Tokyo	www.seibu-la.co.jp/nettaikan/
Joetsu Aquarium	2018	Joetsu, Niigata	www.umigatari.jp/joetsu/
Hamura Zoo	1991	Hamura, Tokyo	www.t-net.ne.jp/~hamura-z/
Xpark	2020	Zhongli District, Taoyuan, Taiwan	www.xpark.com.tw

== See also ==
  - Maxell Aqua Park Shinagawa
  - Sendai Umino-Mori Aquarium
  - Joetsu Aquarium Umigatari
  - Xpark
  - Itabashi Botanical Garden
