= Sendai Umino-Mori Aquarium =

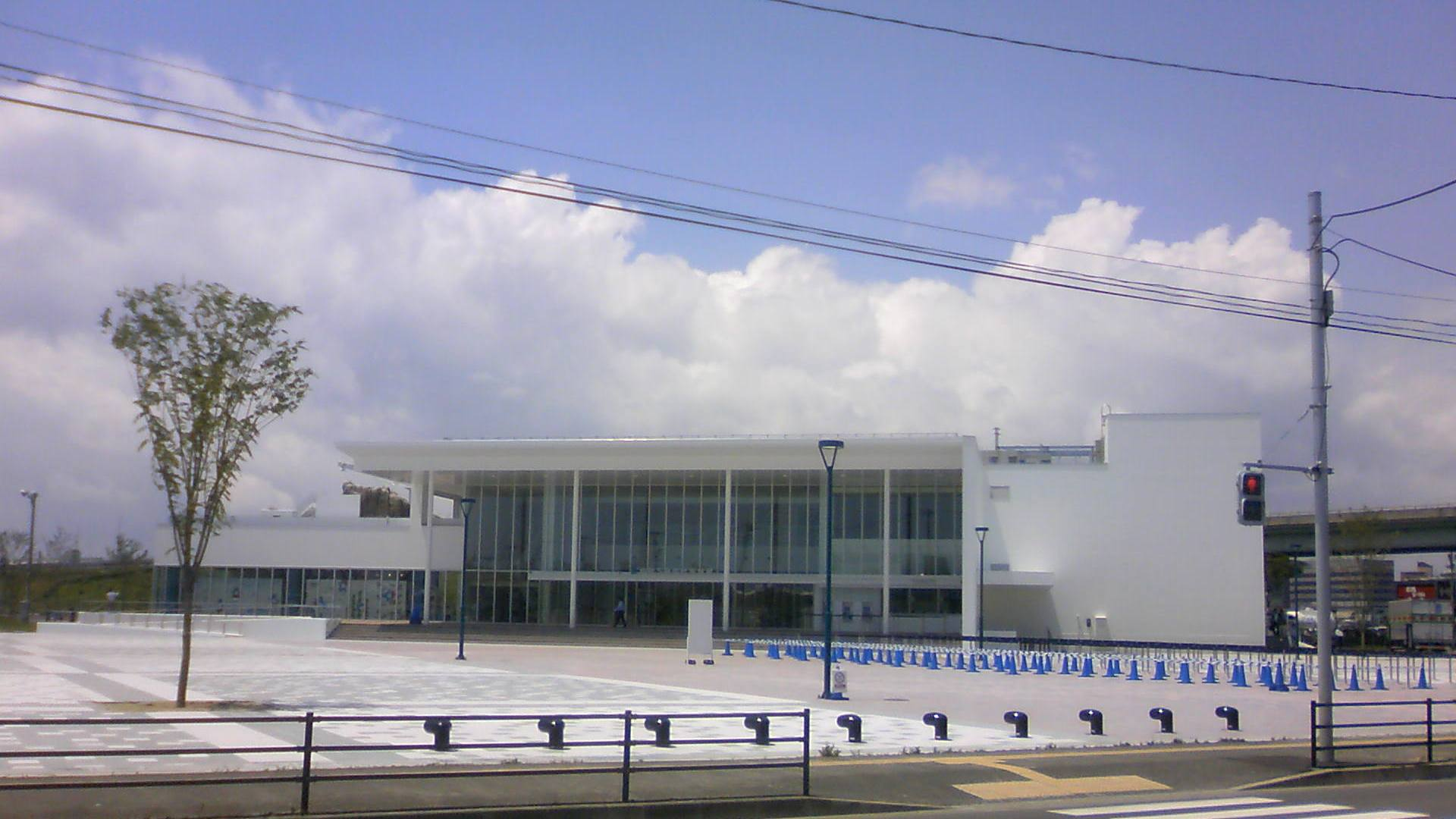
- Sendai Umino-Mori Aquarium
- Interactive map of Sendai Umino-Mori Aquarium
- Date opened: 1 July 2015
- Location: Sendai, Miyagi, Japan
- No. of animals: 50,000
- No. of species: 300
- Volume of largest tank: 990,000 litres (262,000 US gal)
- Total volume of tanks: 3,100,000 litres (819,000 US gal)
- Memberships: JAZA
- Major exhibits: Blue shark Dolphins' show
- Management: Yokohama Hakkeijima
- Website: English website

Sendai Umino-Mori Aquarium (仙台うみの杜水族館, Sendai Umino-Mori Suizokukan; lit. 'Sendai Ocean's Forest Aquarium') is a public aquarium located in Sendai, Miyagi Prefecture, Japan. It opened in 2015 as a successor to the Marinepia Matsushima Aquarium, which had been open for 88 years.

== History ==
=== Marinepia Matsushima Aquarium ===
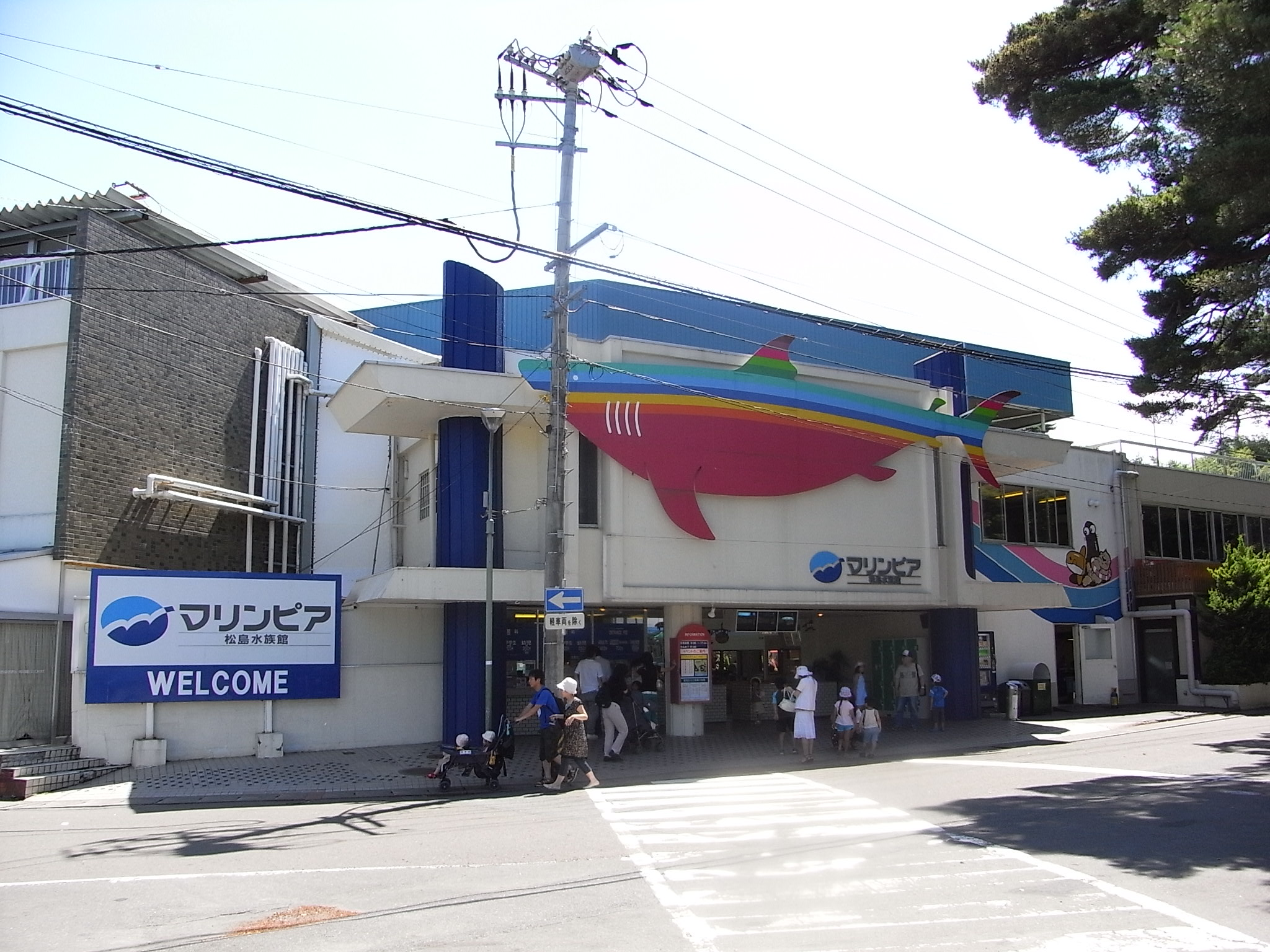
Exterior of Marinepia Matsushima Aquarium

Marinepia Matsushima Aquarium (マリンピア松島水族館, Marinpia Matsushima Suizokukan; where Marinepia is a combination of Marine 'Marine' and pia 'pier') was a public aquarium in Matsushima, Miyagi. It opened on April 1, 1927, and closed on May 10, 2015, making it the second longest-operating aquarium in Japan, after Uozu Aquarium.

Marinepia Matsushima Aquarium was operated by Sendai Express, which, in 2001, began to consider a renovation of the aquarium. Following the opening of Oga Aquarium Gao and Aquamarine Fukushima, the number of visitors to the aquarium began to decline.

In 2009, Sendai City announced plans to relocate the aquarium to Takasago Central Park in Sendai Port. However, in February 2010, Sendai express scrapped these plans, due to the lack of prospects for raising funds. In 2013, six companies, including Yokohama Hakkeijima Sea Paradise, established the Sendai Aquarium Development Co., Ltd. The new company built Sendai Umino-Mori Aquarium in the hinterland of Sendai Port, Marinepia Matsushima Aquarium's new location. Sendai express did not invest in the new aquarium, but the new aquarium accepted animals from the Marinepia aquarium.

=== Tōhoku earthquake and tsunami ===
In March 2011, the Tōhoku earthquake and tsunami caused seawater and mud to flood Marinepia Matsushima Aquarium, breaking its circulation pump. This resulted in the loss of about 5% of the aquarium's approximately 4000 animals. The aquarium received new tropical fish and jellyfish from Kamo Aquarium, Osaka Aquarium, and Kagoshima Aquarium.

== Exhibits ==
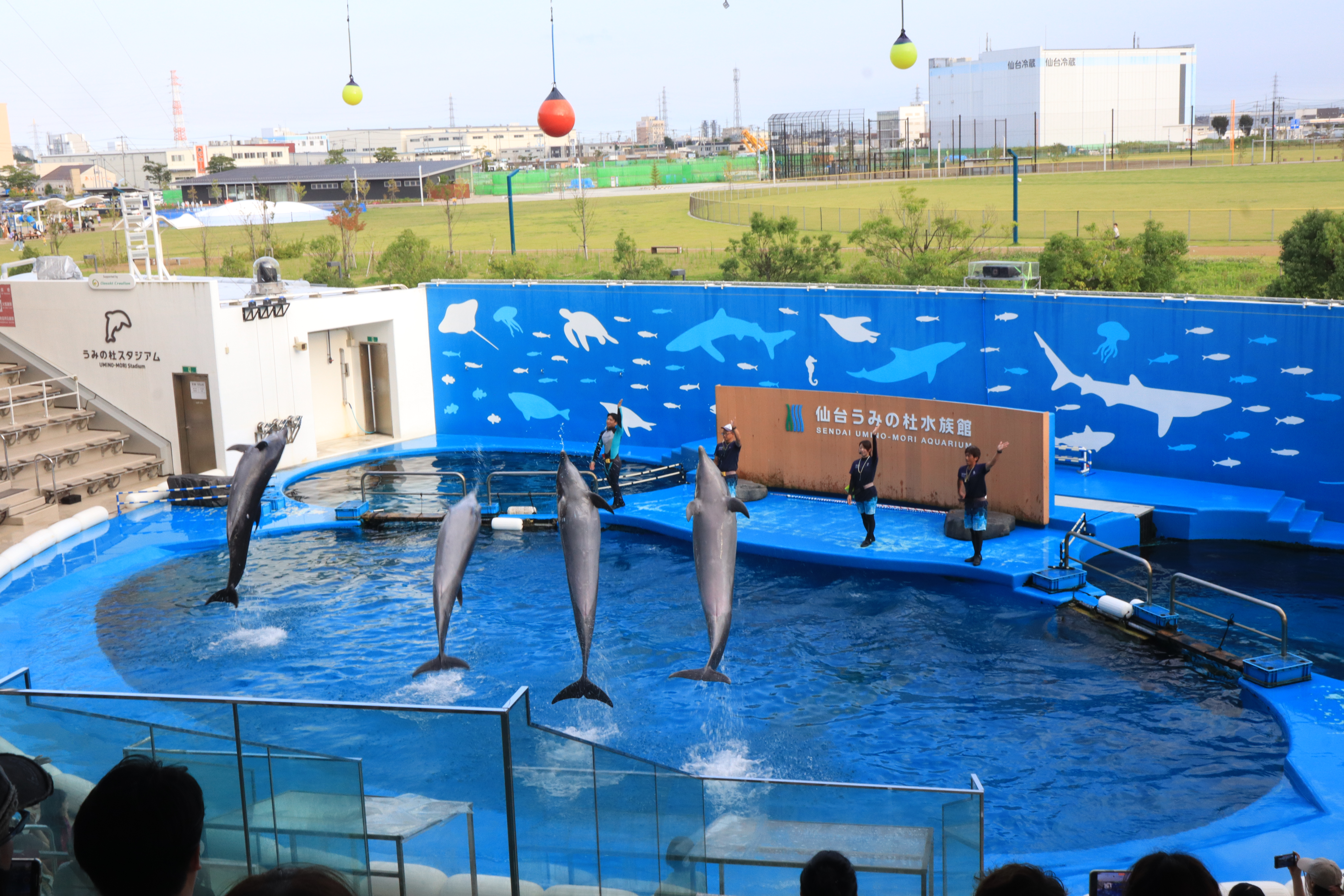
Dolphin show

Inherited from the Marinepia Matsushima Aquarium are Commerson's dolphins and finless porpoises, along with fish from the Sanriku region.

The facility is a two-story building with 100 fish tanks. Inside, there is a dolphin and sea lion show pool that can accommodate about 1,000 people.

=== Captive blue sharks ===
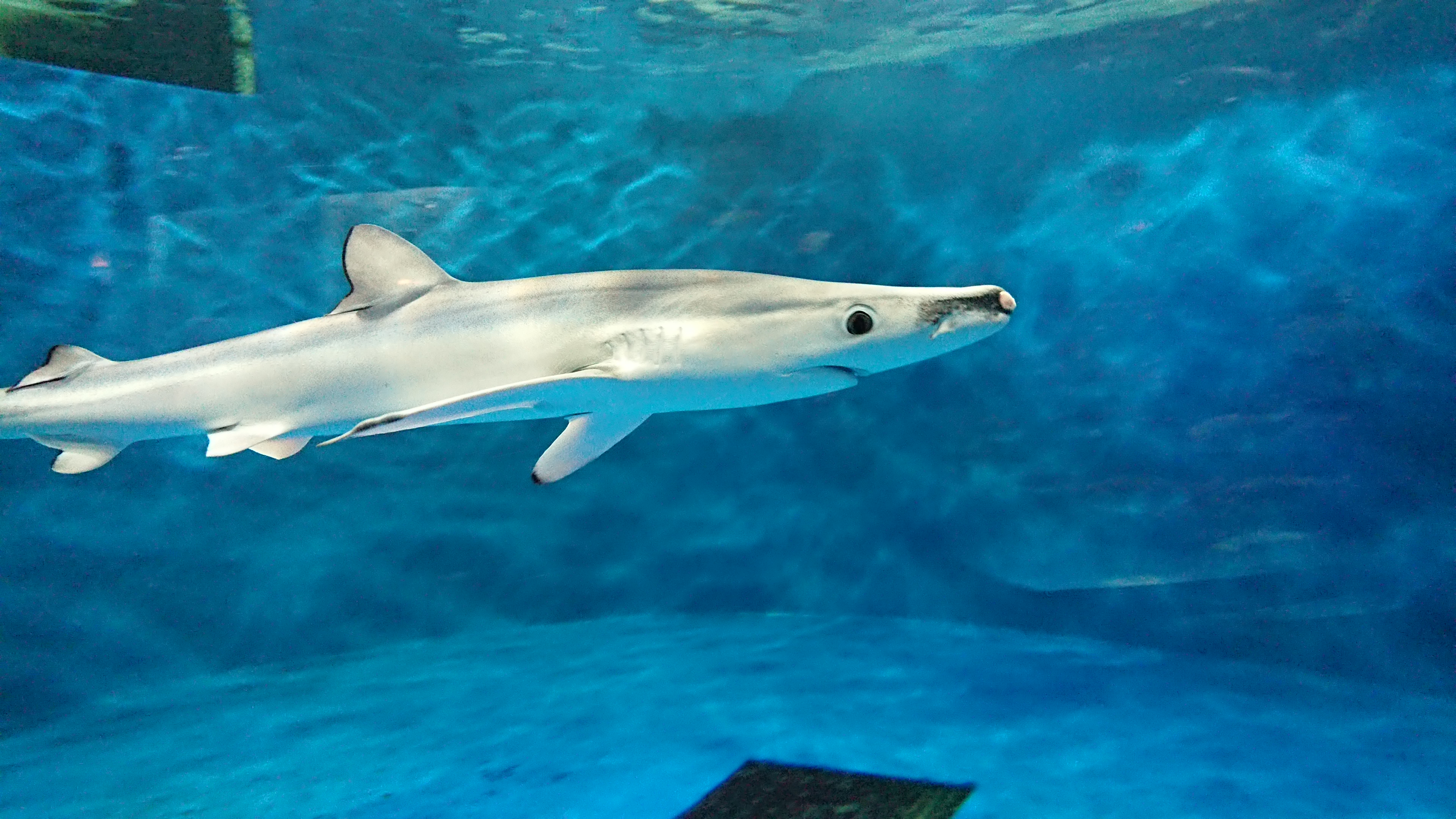
Blue shark

The aquarium has a focus on rearing and exhibiting blue sharks as representative fish from Sanriku. Bred in a cylindrical tank separate from the large main tank, most of the young sharks did not last long initially.

In 2016, three blue sharks were captured and brought to the aquarium. In 2017, one of these sharks, a male, broke the previous record of captivity of 244 days. The previous record was set at Tokyo Sea Life Park.

A new blue shark was later captured in 2018 and survived in captivity for 873 days until it died in December 2020, significantly increasing the record. The shark was captured in Shizugawa Bay on July 27, 2018, and taken to the aquarium. At the time of delivery, the shark was 51 cm (1.67 ft), weighed approximately 345g, and was estimated to be a year old. The cause of death was attributed to disordered swimming due to dehydration. At the time of its death, the shark was 114 cm (3.74 ft) and weighed 4kg. This growth rate was said to be the same as that of blue sharks in the wild.

== Facilities ==
=== Floor 1F ===
- Welcome Hall
- The seas of Japan
  - 1. The Submarine Forest of Sea Pineapple (Maboya)
  - 2. Sparkling of Life
  - 3. Oyashio, Cold Current
  - 4. Irodori, Sea of Saweed
  - 5. Tairyo, Great Fish
  - 6. Naiwan, Sea of Blessing
  - 7. Amamo, Sea Cradel
  - 8. Higate, Cultivating Sea Life
  - 9. Shinkai, Deep Sea
  - 10. UMINO－MORI Lab
  - 11. The Hirose River, the Source of Sea
  - UMINO-MORI Beach

=== Floor 2F ===
- 12. The Gallery for People
- 13. Scene I Oceania
- 14. Scene II Europe
- 15. Scene III Africa
- 16. Scene IV North America and South America
- 17. Scene V Asia
- 18. Our Mother Sea
- 19. Communication Wall
- 20. Jellyfish Room
- The Plaza of Marine Animals (supported by Mitsui Life)

=== Shops ===
- Cabana
- Umimori shop Museum Shop
- Wakuwaku ocean Food Court

== Gallery ==
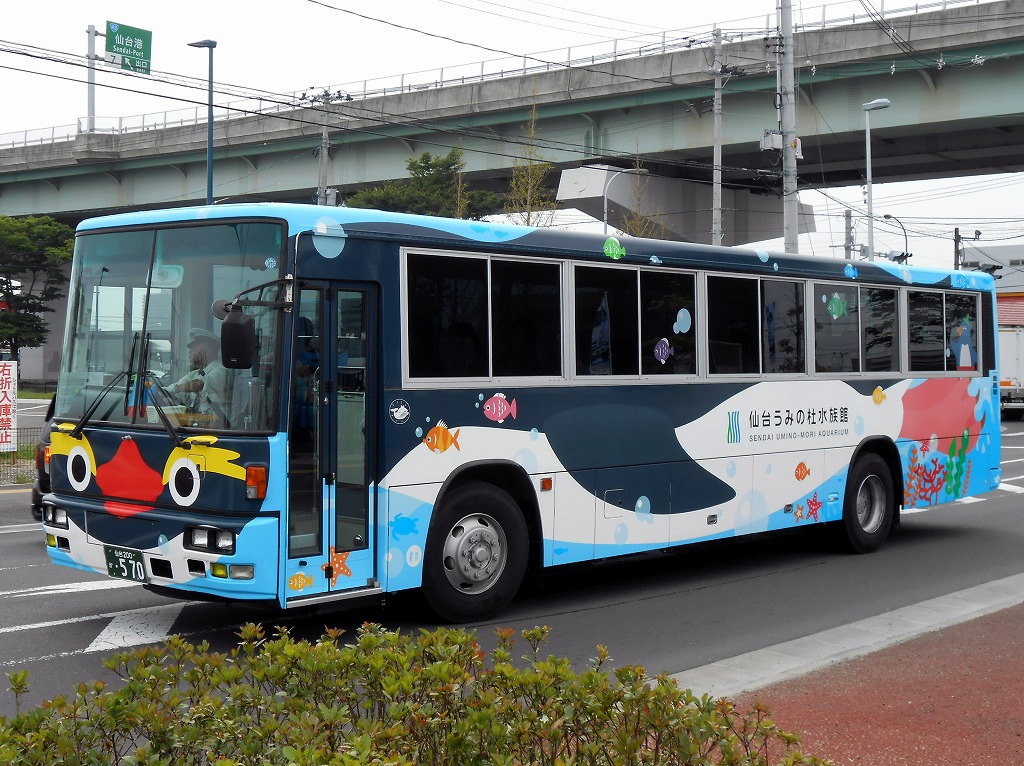

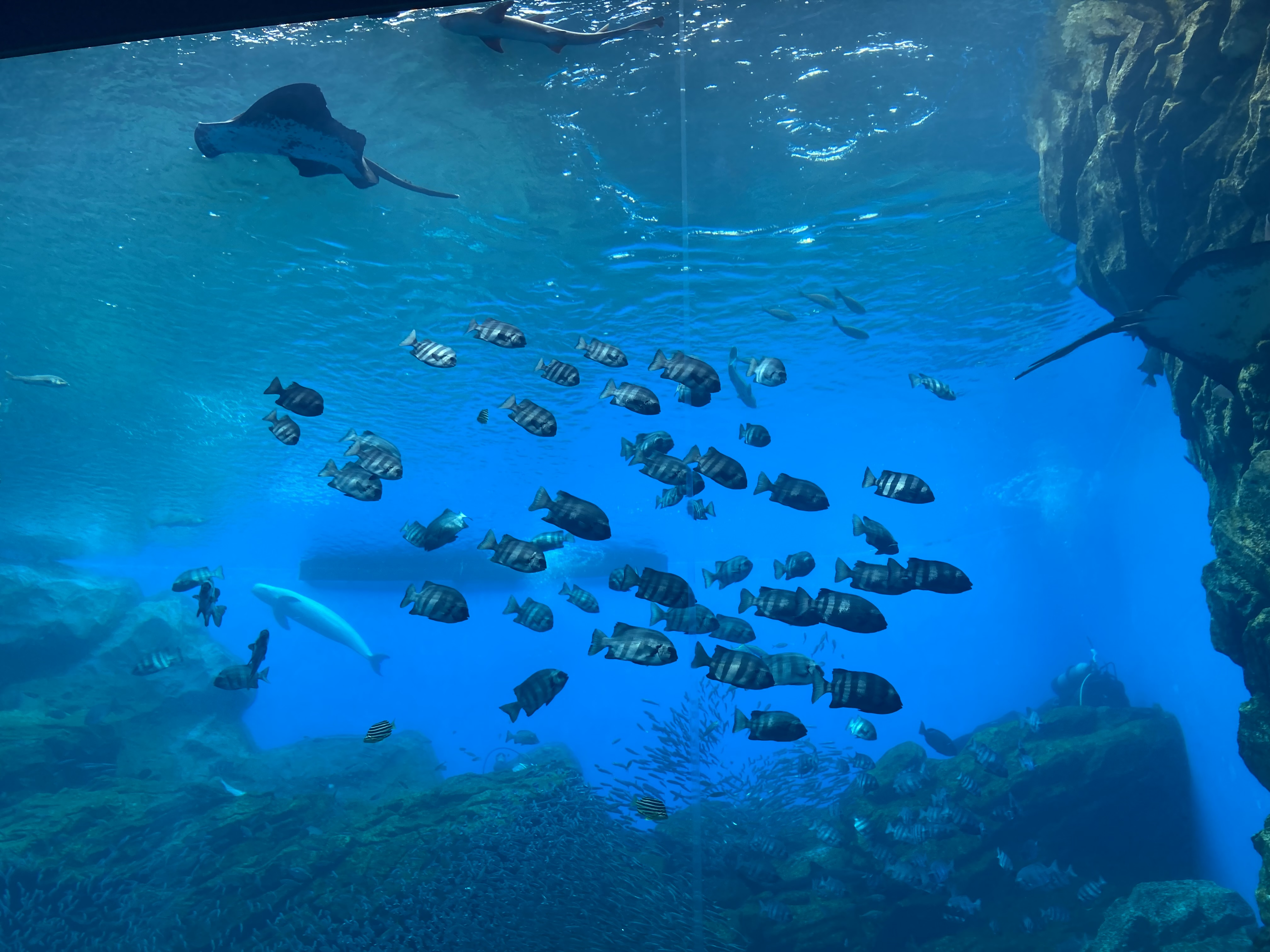

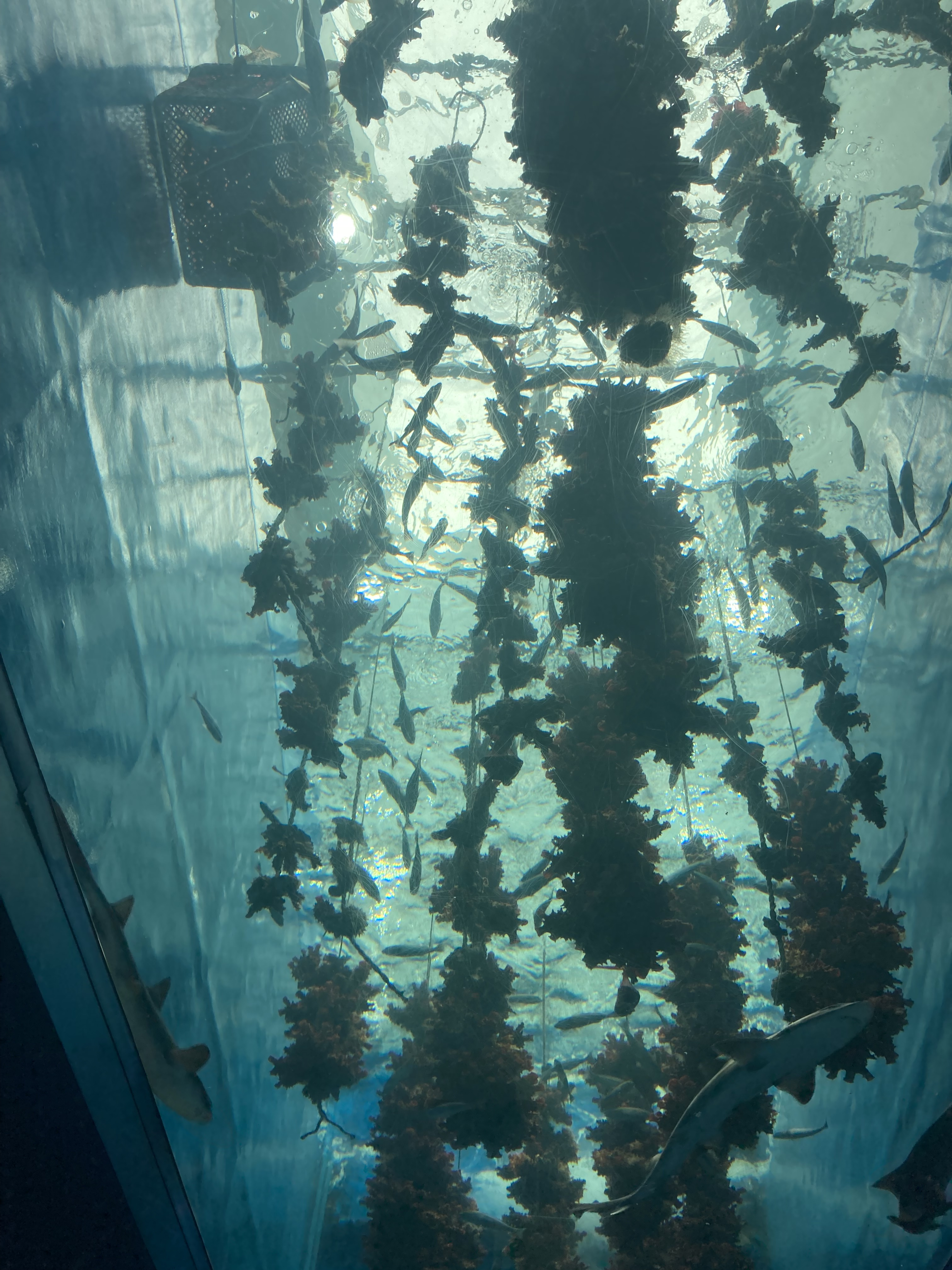

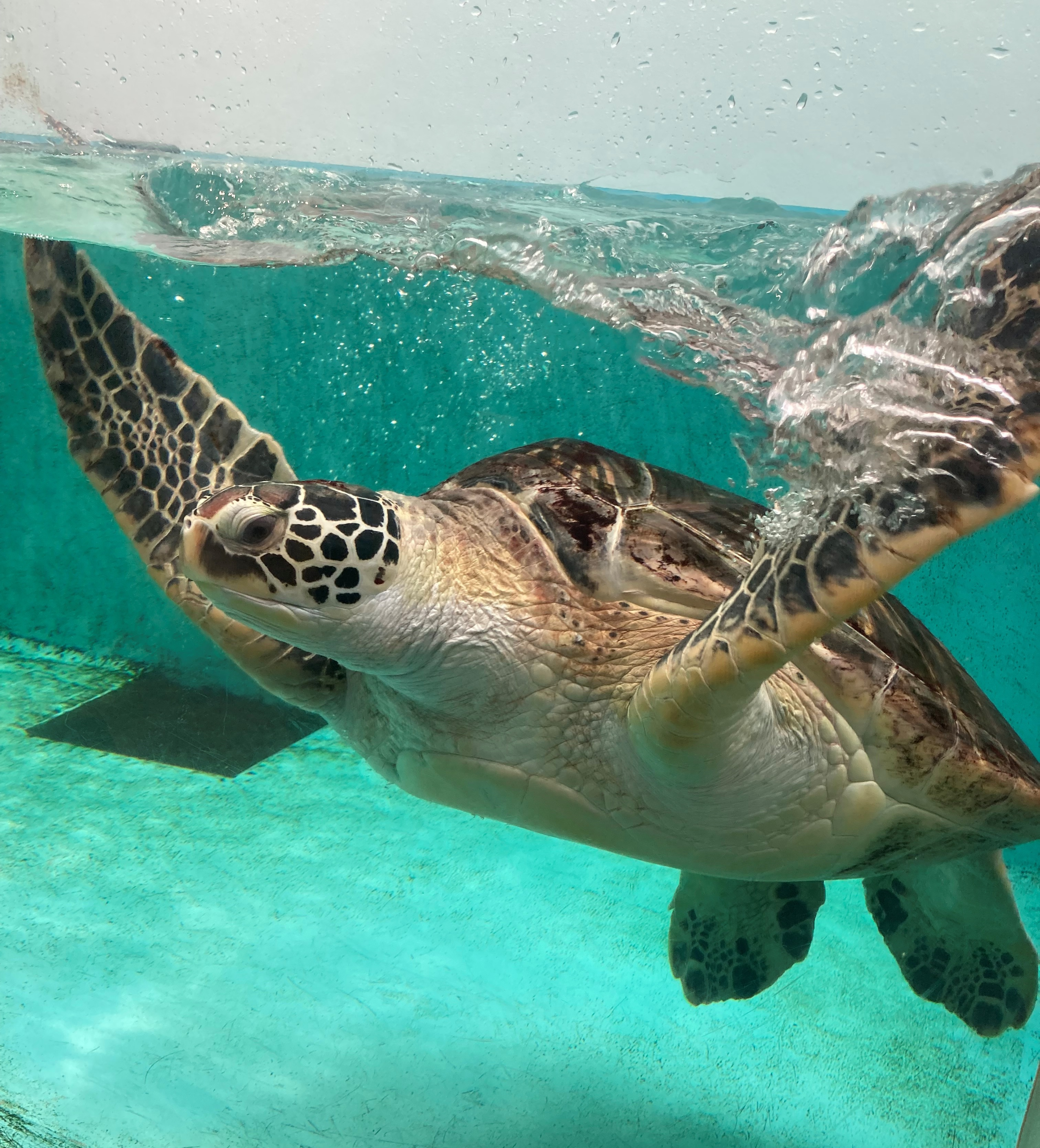

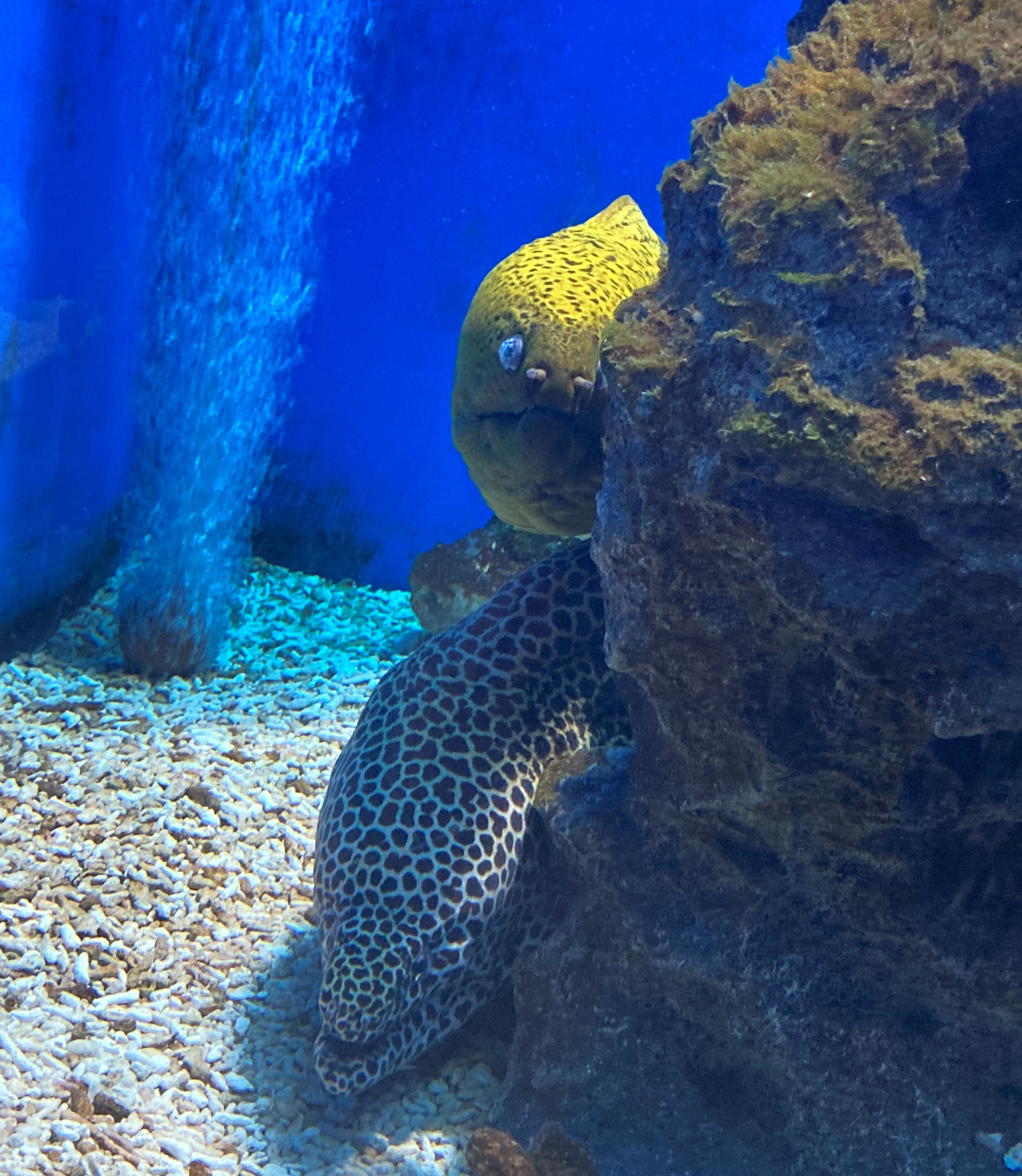

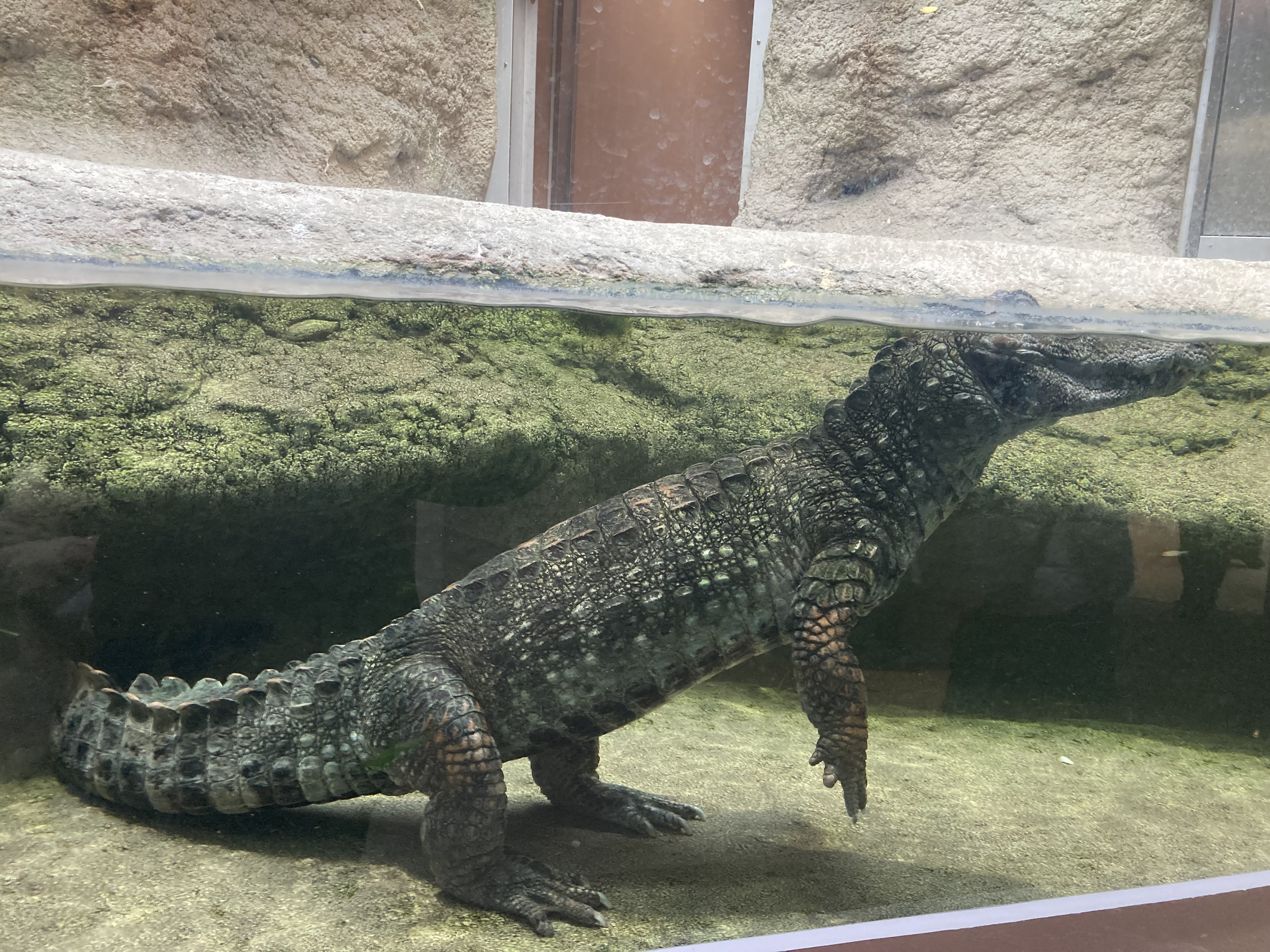

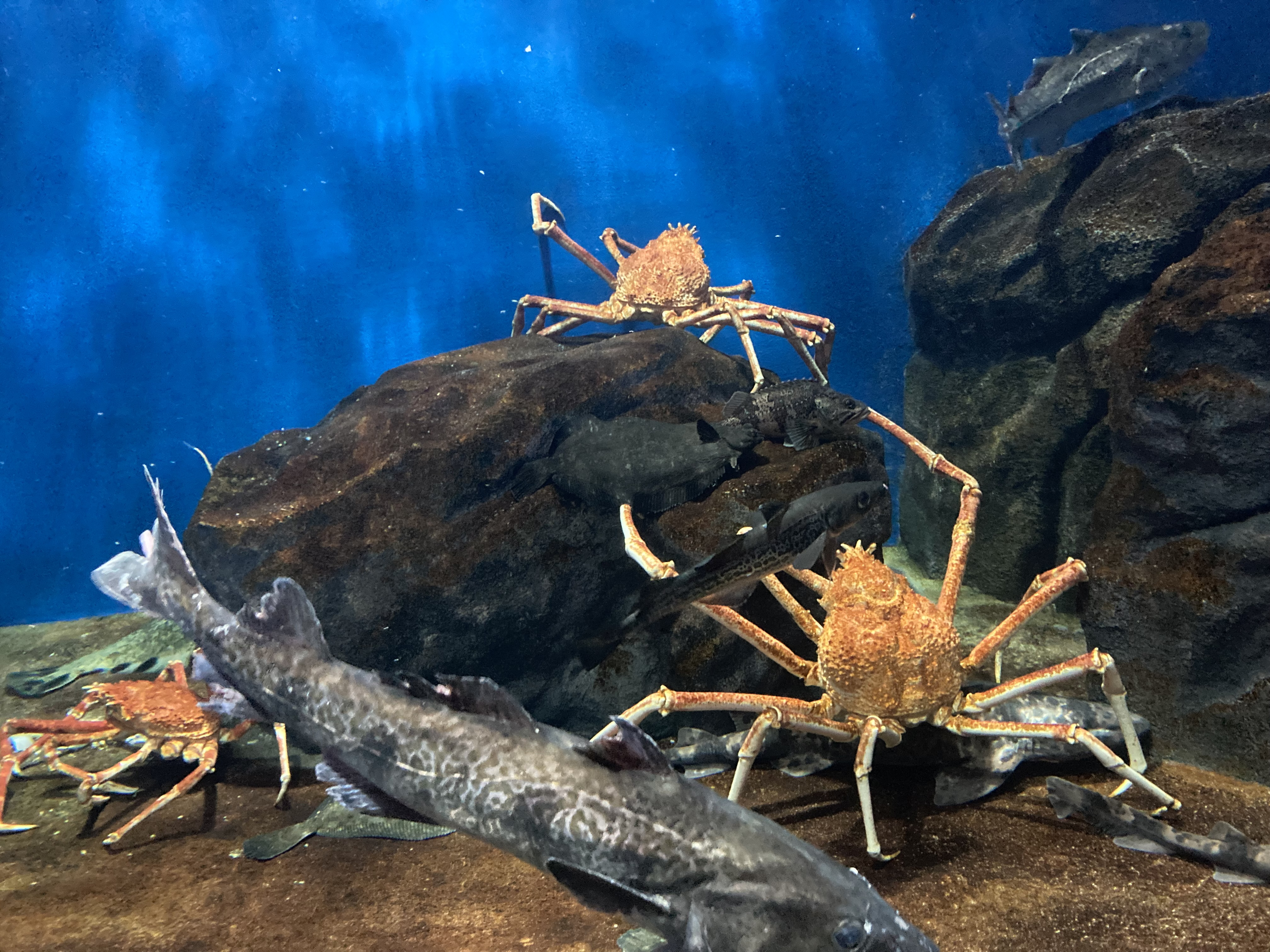

== See also ==
  - Yokohama Hakkeijima Sea Paradise
  - Maxell Aqua Park Shinagawa
  - Joetsu Aquarium
  - Xpark
  - Itabashi Botanical Garden
