= Itabashi Botanical Garden =

Indoor botanical garden in Japan

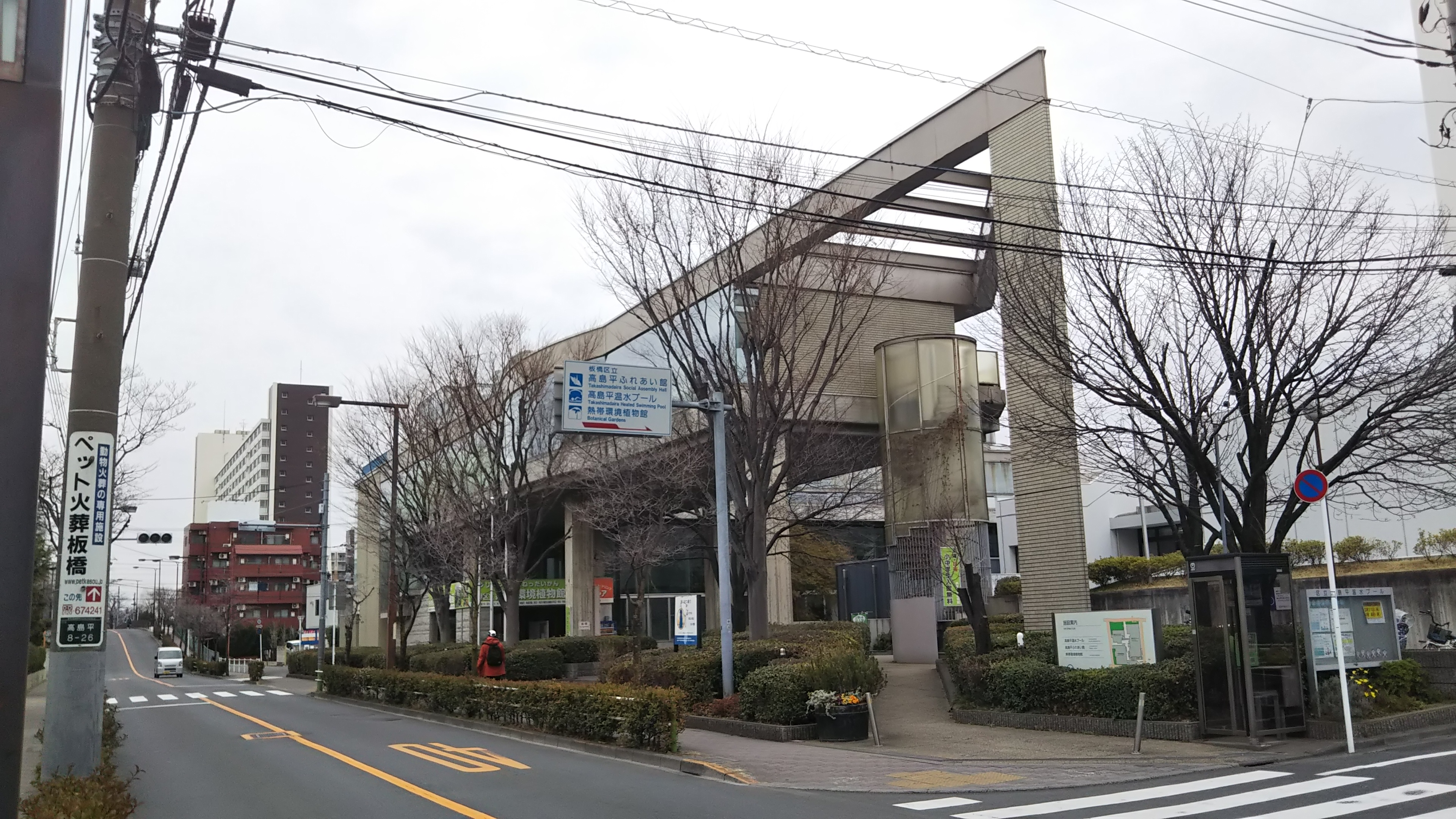
- Interactive map of Itabashi Botanical Garden
- Type: Botanical
- Coordinates: 35°47′30.8″N 139°39′50.7″E

The Itabashi Botanical Garden (東京都板橋区立熱帯環境植物館, Tōkyō-to Itabashi Kuritsu Nettai Kankyō Shokubutsukan; 1,000 m^{2}) is an indoor botanical garden located at 8-29-2 Takashimadaira, Itabashi, Tokyo, Japan. There is also an aquarium on site. It is open daily except Mondays. It was closed to start renovation work in September 2020 and reopened on April 20, 2021.

== History ==
The Itabashi Botanical Garden is a garden that utilizes the residual heat from the Itabashi Garbage Disposal Plant, and was opened in September 1994 after renovating the existing greenhouse botanical garden. Around the same time as the opening, Itabashi Ward signed a "Joint Declaration of Friendship" with the government of Penang, Malaysia. 2005 saw the introduction of a designated manager system, and a joint venture of Seibu Landscaping, Yokohama Hakkeijima, and Seibu Greenery Management was entrusted with the management of the facility. Renovation work began in September 2020, was completed in April 2021, and the garden reopened on April 20, 2021.

== Overview ==
The terrestrial exhibits include a nipa palm mangrove forest, and a greenhouse with Southeast Asian plants that include species such as Dipterocarpaceae, orchids, and rhododendrons. An attached Malaysian coffee shop is open to the public as a rest area on weekdays.

The aquarium inside the botanical garden is home to fish species from the deep sea, coral reefs, and Asian tropical rainforests. There are also giant freshwater stingrays on display.

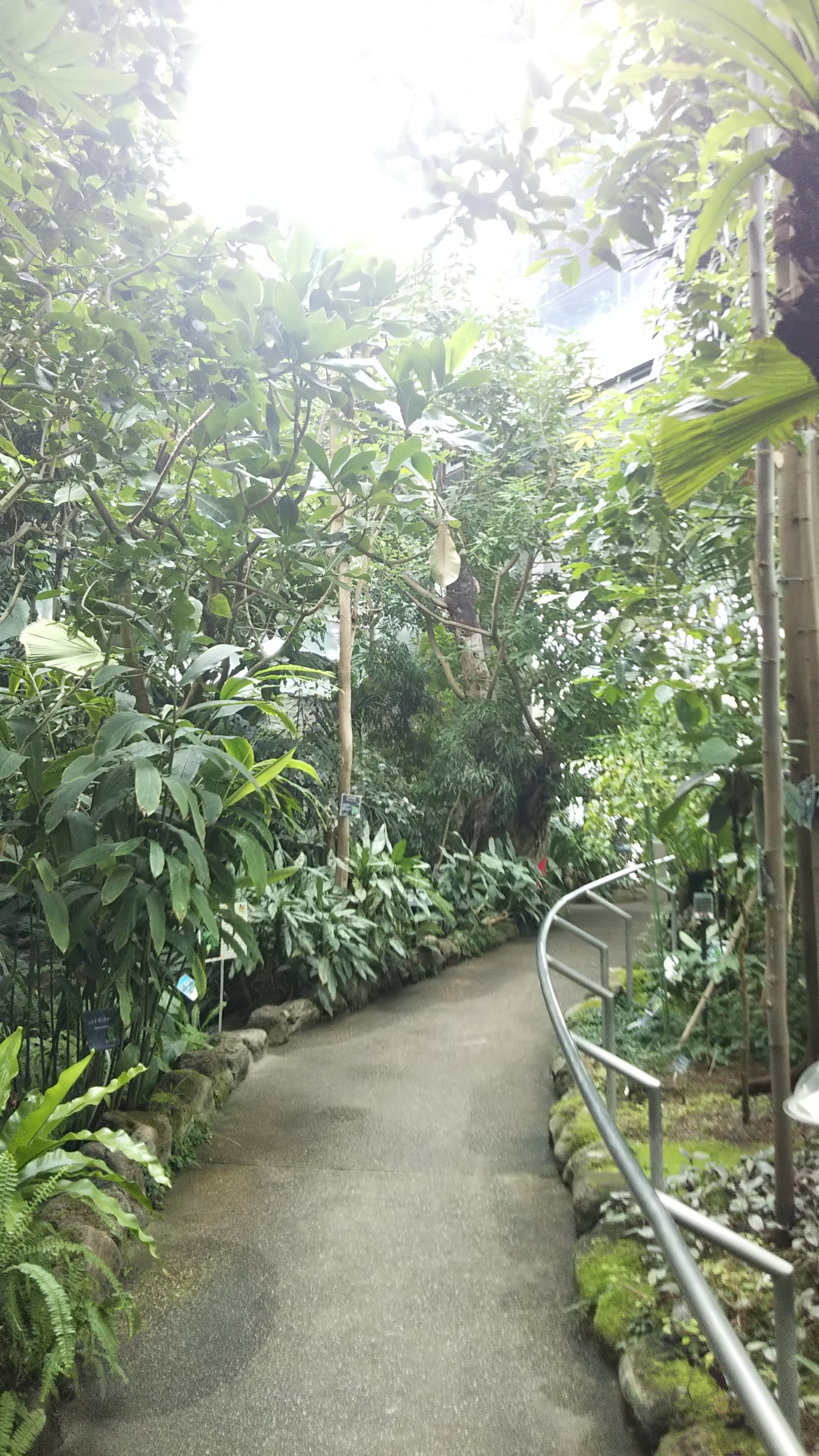
A greenhouse that recreates a tropical forest

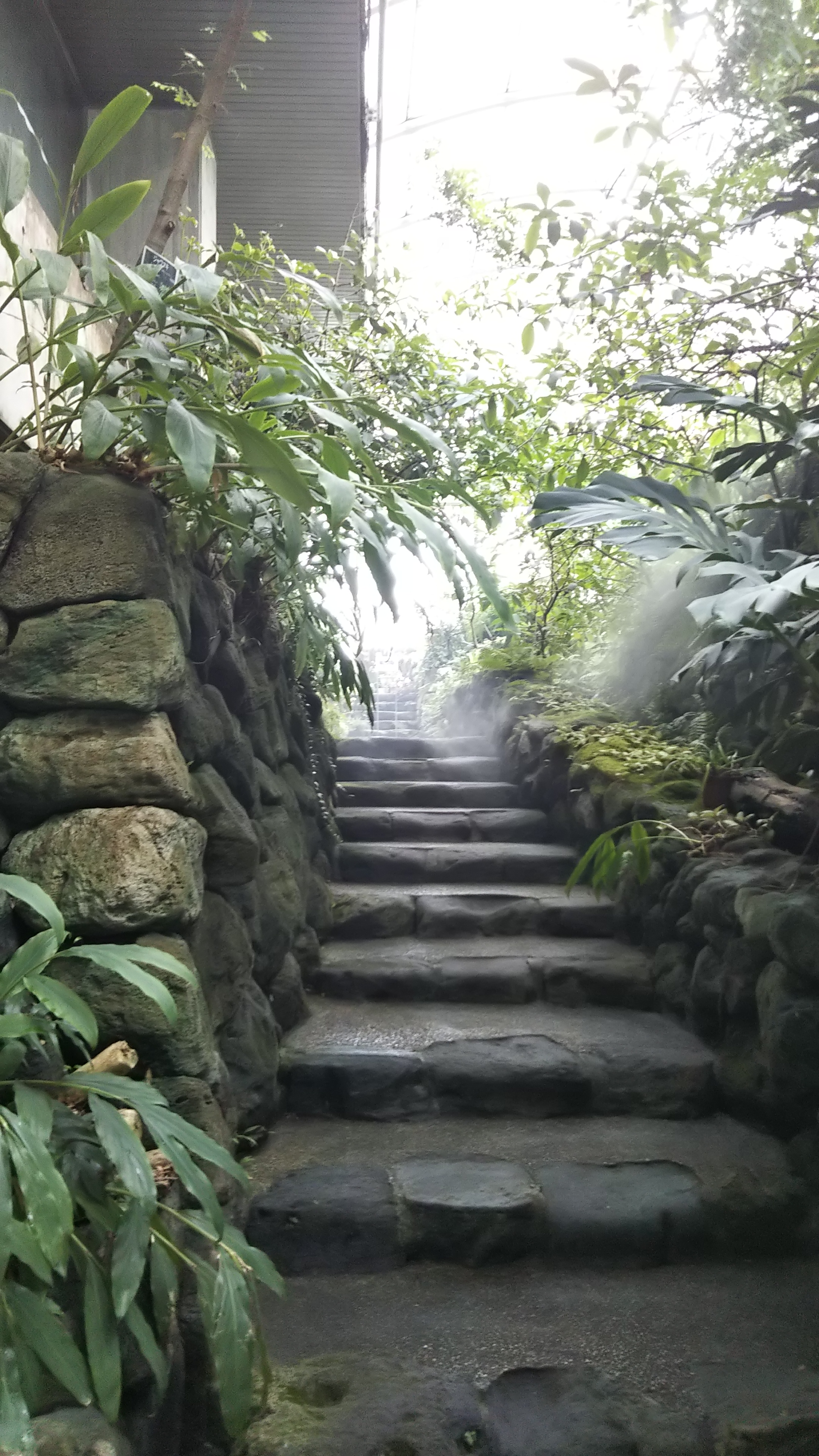
Cloud forest displaying alpine plants

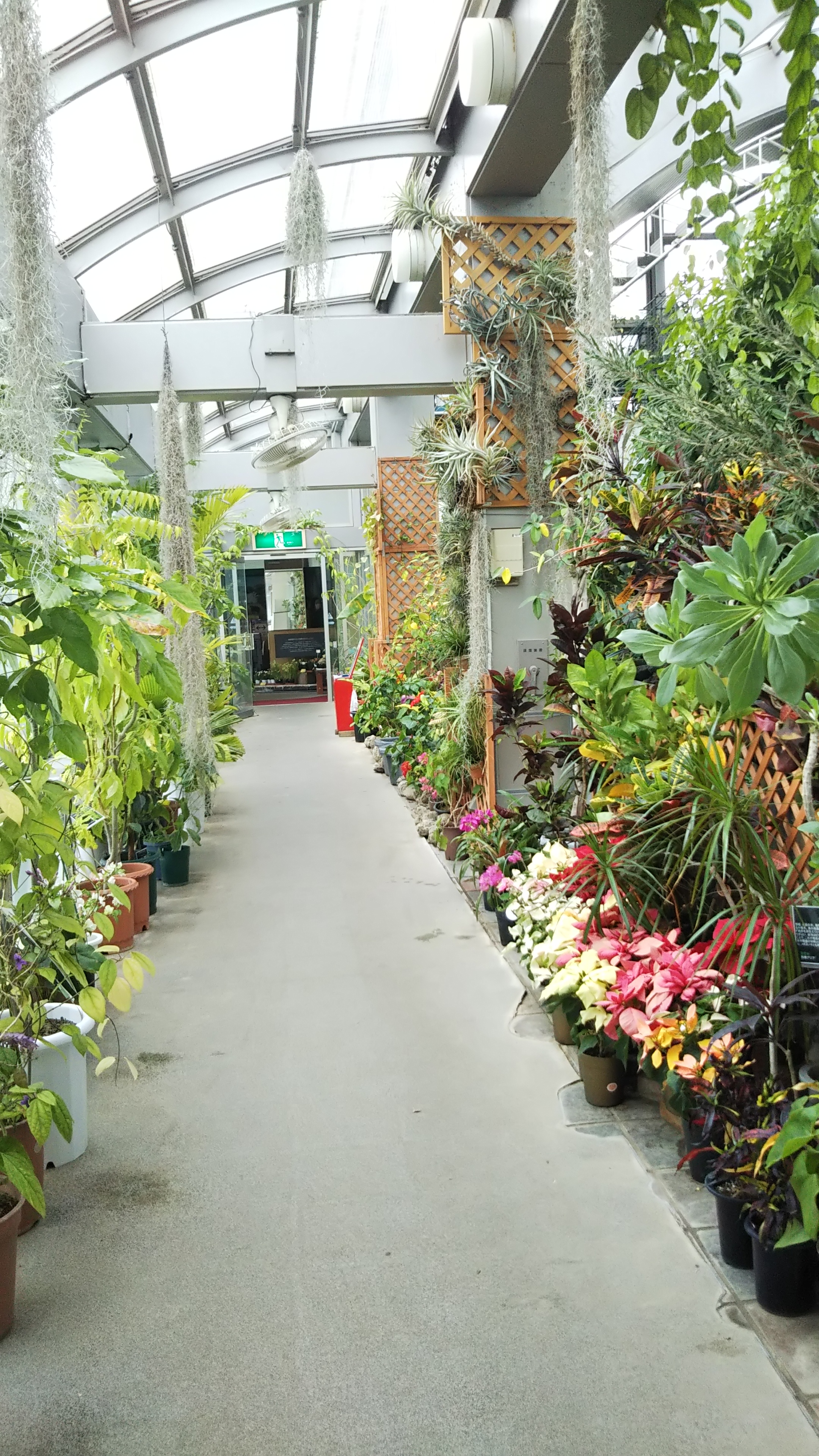
View of the greenhouse

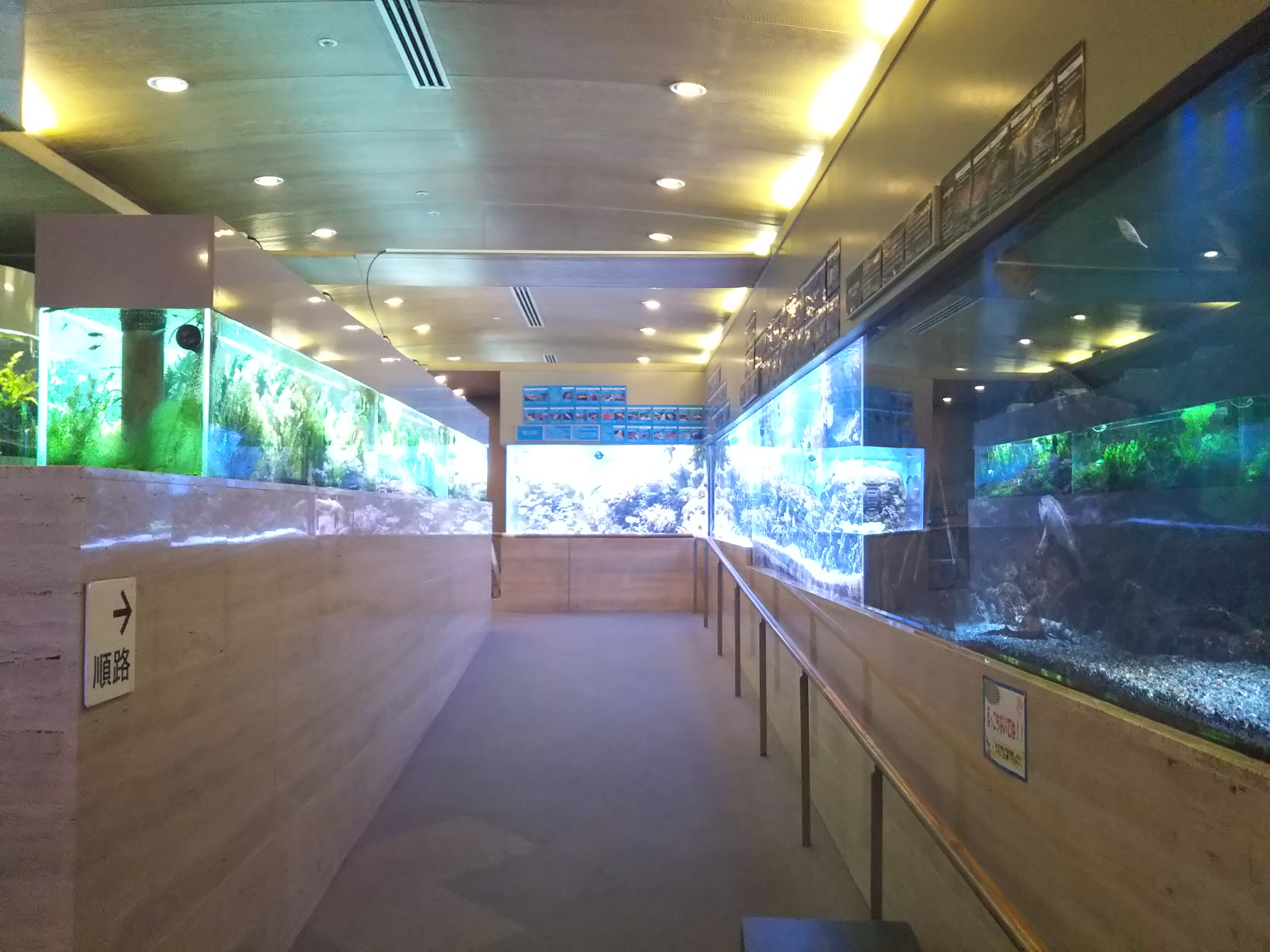
The aquarium

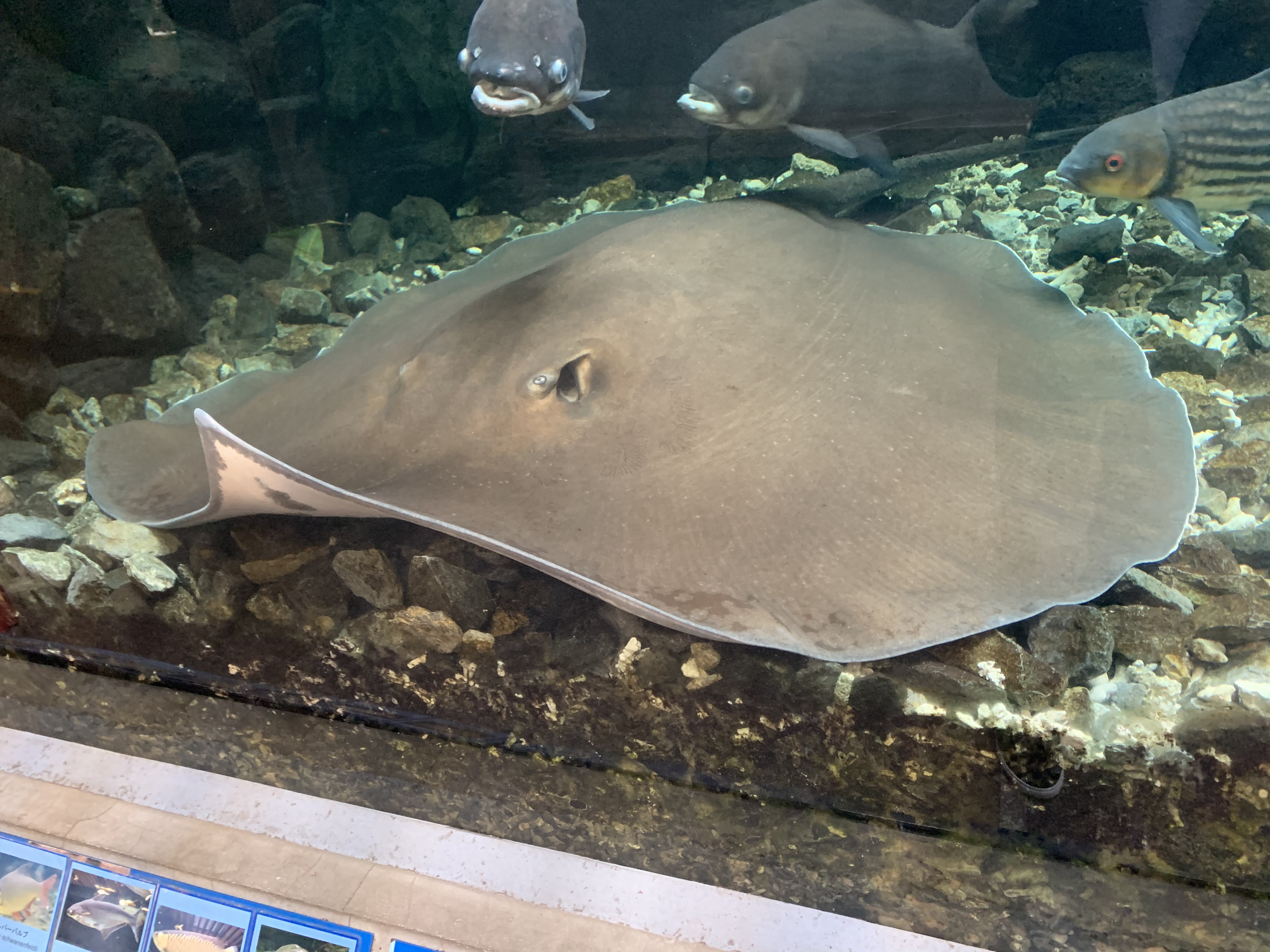
Giant freshwater stingray

== See also ==
- Facilities with the same Management
  - Yokohama Hakkeijima Sea Paradise
  - Maxell Aqua Park Shinagawa
  - Sendai Umino-Mori Aquarium
  - Joetsu Aquarium
  - Xpark
- List of botanical gardens in Japan
