= Shintarō Asanuma =

Japanese voice actor (born 1976)

- 浅沼 晋太郎
- Born: January 5, 1976 (age 50); Morioka, Iwate Prefecture, Japan
- Occupations: Screenwriter; director; actor; voice actor; copywriter; designer
- Years active: 2000–present
- Agent: DANDELION
- Notable credit(s): Ace of Diamond as Kuramochi Youichi; Seitokai Yakuindomo as Takatoshi Tsuda; The Tatami Galaxy as the Protagonist; My First Girlfriend Is a Gal as Junichi Hashiba; Tokyo Ghoul as Nishiki Nishio; Xenoblade Chronicles as Shulk; Ensemble Stars! as Leo Tsukinaga; Hypnosis Mic: Division Rap Battle as Samatoki Aohitsugi; Kikai Sentai Zenkaiger as Juran / Zenkai Juran; Ikemen Prince as Gilbert von Obsidian
- Height: 175 cm (5 ft 9 in)

Shintarō Asanuma (浅沼 晋太郎, Asanuma Shintarō; born January 5, 1976) is a Japanese screenwriter, director, actor, copywriter and designer. He was affiliated with Office Osawa and currently attached under DANDELION.

== Filmography ==
=== Television animation ===
2006

- Ouran High School Host Club – male student B (ep 24)
- xxxHOLiC – Student B (ep 24)
- Zegapain – Kyo Sogoru
- Kirarin Revolution – Subaru Tsukishima
- Mamotte! Lollipop – Will
- Kujibiki Unbalance – Mugio Rokuhara

2007

- Engage Planet Kiss Dum – Ueno (ep 9 and 10)
- Kamichama Karin – Kirio Karasuma
- Bokurano – Yosuke Kirie, Shinichi Kodaka (ep 4)
- Mushi-Uta – Daisuke Kusuriya
- Da Capo II – Yoshiyuki Sakurai
- Shakugan no Shana Second – Chairman (ep 12)
- Minami-ke – Sensei, Takeru-ojisan
- Genshiken 2 – Neko Kazamatsuri (ep 1)
- Ghost Hound – Michio Hoshino

2008

- Minami-ke: Okawari – Takeru-ojisan
- Yu-Gi-Oh! 5D's – Crow Hogan
- Da Capo II Second Season – Yoshiyuki Sakurai
- Shugo Chara! – Shuji Hinamori (ep 35)
- Birdy the Mighty: Decode – Sudo Ryota
- Legends of the Dark King: A Fist of the North Star Story – young Juza (ep 7)
- Nodame Cantabile: Paris Arc – Frank
- Negibozu no Asataro – Kyuubee

2009

- Gintama – Parody Goku (ep 119)
- Minami-ke: Okaeri – Takeru
- Samurai Harem – Keita Torigaya
- Birdy the Mighty Decode:02 – Ryota Sudo, Valic
- Polyphonica Crimson S
- Guin Saga – István
- First Love Limited – Etsu Kusuda
- Sweet Blue Flowers – Yasushi Kawanoi
- Modern Magic Made Simple – Sōshirō Anehara
- Nyan Koi! – Junpei Kōsaka

2010

- Nodame Cantabile: Finale – Frank
- The Betrayal Knows My Name – Masamune Shinmei
- The Tatami Galaxy – Protagonist
- Okami-san and Her Seven Companions – Tarō Urashima
- Seitokai Yakuindomo – Takatoshi Tsuda
- Mazinkaizer SKL – Ken Kaidō

2011

- Dream Eater Merry – Chris Evergreen (ep 4-5)
- Beelzebub – Kazuya Yamamura
- Fractale – Sunda Granitz
- Sket Dance – Seiji Igarashi (ep 16-17, 20)
- Hoshizora e Kakaru Hashi – Hoshino Kazuma
- Moshidora – Masayoshi Nikai
- Phi Brain: Puzzle of God – Kaito Daimon
- Haganai – Masaru Suzuki (ep 2)

2012

- Place to Place – Sakaki Inui
- Accel World – Takumu Mayuzumi (Taku)
- Beyblade: Shogun Steel – Blader Guy
- One Piece – Zeo
- Phi Brain: Puzzle of God 2nd Season – Kaito Daimon
- The Pet Girl of Sakurasou – Kazuki Fujisawa
- Blast of Tempest – Takumi Hayakawa
- Space Brothers – Yamato Mizoguchi

2013

- Cuticle Detective Inaba – Akiyoshi
- Ace of Diamond – Kuramochi Youichi
- Problem Children Are Coming from Another World, Aren't They? – Sakamaki Izayoi
- Majestic Prince – Toshikazu Asagi
- Minami-ke: Tadaima – Sensei, Takeru-ojisan
- Psycho-Pass – Mitsuru Sasayama (ep 12)
- Ro-Kyu-Bu! – Ryūichi Suga
- Phi Brain: Puzzle of God 3rd Season – Kaito Daimon

2014

- Seitokai Yakuindomo* – Takatoshi Tsuda
- Hamatora – Nojima (ep 2)
- Z/X Ignition – Rindo
- No-Rin – Kosaku Hata
- Wake Up, Girls! – Kōhei Matsuda
- Daimidaler: Prince vs Penguin Empire – Dennis
- Nobunaga Concerto – Maeda Toshiie
- One Week Friends – Hajime Kujo
- Tokyo Ghoul – Nishiki Nishio
- Baby Steps – Hiromi Iwasa
- Akame ga Kill! – Susanoo
- Gundam Reconguista in G – Ringo Lon Giamanotta

2015

- Ace of Diamond 2nd Season – Youichi Kuramochi
- Assassination Classroom – Hiroto Maehara
- Baby Steps Season 2 – Hiromi Iwasa
- K: Return of Kings - Masaomi Dewa, Yujiro Benzai
- Chivalry of a Failed Knight – Nagi Arisuin
- Tokyo Ghoul √A – Nishiki Nishio
- Yu-Gi-Oh! Arc-V – Crow Hogan

2016

- Snow White with the Red Hair 2 – Itoya
- Assassination Classroom 2nd Season – Hiroto Maehara
- She and Her Cat: Everything Flows – Black Cat, I (narration)
- Touken Ranbu: Hanamaru- Nakigitsune (6 episodes)
- The Asterisk War 2nd Season – Verner (ep 4-5, 7-9)
- Undefeated Bahamut Chronicle – Lagried False (ep 2, 11-12)

2017

- My First Girlfriend Is a Gal - Junichi Hashiba, EroJunichi (ep 1-3, 5, 8)
- Food Wars! Shokugeki no Souma: The Third Plate - Rentarou Kusunoki
- Scum's Wish – Atsuya Kirishima

2018

- Zoku Touken Ranbu: Hanamaru – Nakigitsune (ep. 2, 4-7, 10)
- Violet Evergarden – Aiden Field (ep. 11)
- Cutie Honey Universe – Seiji Hayami
- Tsurune – Masaki Takigawa

2019

- Ace of Diamond Act II - Yōichi Kuramochi
- Carole & Tuesday – Mermaid Sisters
- Ensemble Stars! – Leo Tsukinaga
- Given – Ugetsu Murata

2020

- A3! Season Spring & Summer – Itaru Chigasaki
- Woodpecker Detective's Office – Takuboku Ishikawa
- Hypnosis Mic: Division Rap Battle: Rhyme Anima – Samatoki Aohitsugi

2022

- Tatami Time Machine Blues – Protagonist
- Shine On! Bakumatsu Bad Boys! – Katsura Kogorou

2023

- The Legendary Hero Is Dead! – Diego Valentine
- Ao no Orchestra – Yō Hatori
- Hypnosis Mic: Division Rap Battle: Rhyme Anima+ – Samatoki Aohitsugi
- Migi & Dali – Shunpei Akiyama

2024

- Mr. Villain's Day Off – Warumono-san
- Tadaima, Okaeri – Aoto Mochizuki

2025

- Promise of Wizard – Owen
- Tougen Anki – Tsukuyomi Momoka

2026

- Ace of Diamond Act II season 2 - Yōichi Kuramochi

=== Original video animation (OVA) ===
- Shakugan no Shana S (2009) – Yukio Hamaguchi (ep 3-4)
- Birdy the Mighty Decode: The Cipher (2009) – Ryota Sudo
- Tokimeki Memorial 4 OVA (2009) – male student/game protagonist
- Hoshizora e Kakaru Hashi (2011) – Hoshino Kazuma
- Seitokai Yakuindomo (2011) – Takatoshi Tsuda
- Black Butler: Book of Murder (2014) – Arthur Conan Doyle
- Cyborg 009 VS Devilman (2015) - Akira Fudo/Devilman
- Strike the Blood II (2016) - Kazuomi Kusuki

=== Original net animation (ONA) ===
- Onmyōji (2023) – Minamoto no Hiromasa

=== Theatrical animation ===
- The Garden of Sinners: Remaining Sense of Pain – Keita Minato
- Kowarekake no Orgel (2010) – Junpei
- Yu-Gi-Oh!: Bonds Beyond Time (2010) – Crow Hogan
- Cyborg 009 Vs. Devilman (2015) – Devilman / Akira Fudō
- Seitokai Yakuindomo: The Movie (2017) – Takatoshi Tsuda
- Fireworks (2017) – Junichi
- Seitokai Yakuindomo: The Movie 2 (2021) – Takatoshi Tsuda
- Tsurune: The Movie – The First Shot (2022) – Masaki Takigawa
- My Oni Girl (2024) – Ryūji Takahashi
- Zegapain STA (2024) – Kyo Sogoru

=== Live-action films ===
- Doppel (2026) - Terada
- The Invisibles (2026) - Mamoru

=== Tokusatsu ===
- Ultraman Mebius (2006) - Jasyuline (Middle brother (Voice of Dai Matsumoto (Elder brother) und Haji (Youngest brother)) (ep 37)
- Ultra Zero Fight (2012) - Alien Bat Glacier
- Doubutsu Sentai Zyuohger (2016) - Sanbaba (ep 36)
- Ultraman Geed (2017) - Alien Shadow Zena (eps 1, 4 - 5, 9 - 12, 14 - 18, 20 - ,)
- Kikai Sentai Zenkaiger (2021-2022) - Juran/Zenkai Juran (ep 1 - 49)
- Saber + Zenkaiger: Super Hero Senki (2021) - Juran/Zenkai Juran
- Kikai Sentai Zenkaiger vs Kiramager vs Senpaiger (2022) - Juran/Zenkai Juran
- Avataro Sentai Donbrothers VS Zenkaiger (2023) - Juran/Zenkai Juran
- Kamen Rider Gavv (2024) - Kenzo Suga/Kamen Rider Bake/Kamen Rider Bitter Gavv

=== Video games ===
- Super Robot Wars UX – Ken Kaidou (2013)
- Xenoblade Chronicles – Shulk, Zanza (2010)
- Super Smash Bros. for Nintendo 3DS and Wii U – Shulk (2014)
- Street Fighter V - Alex (2016)
- Xenoblade Chronicles X – Custom Male Avatar (2015)
- Zegapain XOR – Kyo Sogoru (2006)
- Omega Quintet – Takt (2015)
- Tokyo Xanadu – Kou Tokisaka (2015)
- Ensemble Stars! – Leo Tsukinaga (2015)
- Accel World vs. Sword Art Online: Millennium Twilight - Takumu Mayuzumi (2017)
- Xenoblade Chronicles 2 - Shulk, Klaus (2017)
- Super Smash Bros. Ultimate – Shulk (2018)
- Touken Ranbu- Nakigitsune & his fox (2015)
- A3! - Chigasaki Itaru (2017)
- Akane-sasu Sekai de Kimi to Utau - Kibi no Makibi (2017)
- Dragalia Lost - Luca (2018)
- Mahotsukai no Yakusoku - Owen (2019)
- Hypnosis Mic: Division Rap Battle: Rhyme Anima – Samatoki Aohitsugi (2020)
- Alchemy Stars - Regal & luke (2021)
- Ikemen Prince - Gilbert Von Obsidian (2021)
- Xenoblade Chronicles 3: Future Redeemed - Shulk (2023)
- Street Fighter 6 - Alex (2026)

=== Drama CDs ===
- Hatoful Boyfriend (2012–2013) – Ryouta Kawara

=== Dubbing ===
- Nicholas Hoult
  - X-Men: First Class – Hank McCoy/Beast
  - X-Men: Days of Future Past – Hank McCoy/Beast
  - X-Men: Apocalypse – Hank McCoy/Beast
  - Dark Phoenix – Hank McCoy/Beast
  - The Banker – Matt Steiner
  - Superman – Lex Luthor
- Domhnall Gleeson
  - Peter Rabbit – Thomas McGregor
  - Peter Rabbit 2: The Runaway – Thomas McGregor
  - Frank of Ireland – Doofus
- Aliens in the Attic – Tom Pearson (Carter Jenkins)
- All About Steve – Howard (DJ Qualls)
- Cinderella – Prince Valiant (Gideon Turner)
- Clarice – Tomas Esquivel (Lucca De Oliveira)
- Constantine (2008 TV Asahi edition) – Chas Kramer (Shia LaBeouf)
- The Darkest Hour – Sean (Emile Hirsch)
- Den Brother – Alex Pearson (Hutch Dano)
- Drake & Josh – Drake Parker (Drake Bell)
- Euphoria – Nate Jacobs (Jacob Elordi)
- Fright Night – Charley Brewster (Anton Yelchin)
- Glee – Sebastian Smythe (Grant Gustin)
- Milk – Cleve Jones (Emile Hirsch)
- Mortuary – Jonathan Doyle (Dan Byrd)
- Mutant World – Geoff King (Jason Cermak)
- Nick & Norah's Infinite Playlist – Nick Yidiaris (Michael Cera)
- The Other Side of Heaven – John H. Groberg (Christopher Gorham)
- Scream 4 – Robbie Mercer (Erik Knudsen)
- Youth – Jimmy Tree (Paul Dano)
- Zeke and Luther – Ezekiel "Zeke" Falcone (Hutch Dano)

== Music ==
=== Singles ===
- "Atchi de Kotchi de" (あっちでこっちで) (2012-04-18) (as Acchi⇔Kocchi with Rumi Ookubo, Nobuhiko Okamoto, Hitomi Nabatame & Kaori Fukuhara)
- "Boku tachi wa Ikiteiru" (僕たちは生きている) (2012-08-21) with Hiroki Aiba & Junya Ikeda

=== Anime songs ===
- Atchi Kotchi "Seishun Love la Boogie woogie!!" (青春ラブ･ラ･ブギウギ!!)
- Gen x Pei Gakuen Kassenroku "Nen-Nen Sai-Sai Day By Day!" (ネンネンサイサイDay By Day!) (with Yūki Kaji)
- Minami-ke "Down&Up! and Dowb↓"
- Ōkami-san "Ai wa Katsu" (愛は勝つ)
- Mondaiji-tachi ga Isekai Kara Kuru Sō Desu yo? "Unknown World"
- Diamond no Ace "GO MY WAY"
- Ensemble stars "Checkmate"
- Ensemble stars "Voice of Sword"
- Ensemble stars "Silent Oath"
- Ensemble stars "Fight for Judge"
- Ensemble stars "Article of Faith"
- Ensemble stars "Knights the Phantom Thief"
- Ensemble stars "Crush of Judgement"
- Ensemble stars "Grateful allegiance"
- Ensemble stars "Birthday of Music!"
- Ensemble stars "Promise Swords"
- Hypnosis Mic "G anthem of Y-CITY"
- Hypnosis Mic "Yokohama Walker" (with Wataru Komada and Shinichiro Kamio)
- Hypnosis Mic "WAR WAR WAR" (with Subaru Kimura, Haruki Ishiya, and Kōhei Amasaki)
- Hypnosis Mic "DEATH RESPECT" (with Wataru Komada, Shinichiro Kamio, Show Hayami, Kijima Ryuichi, and Kento Ito)
- Hypnosis Mic "Yokohama Walker (Triple Trippin' Remix)" (with Wataru Komada and Shinichiro Kamio)
- Hypnosis Mic "T.D.D. LEGEND" (with Subaru Kimura, Show Hayami, and Yuusuke Shirai)
- Hypnosis Mic "Hypnosis Mic -Division Rap Battle-" (ヒプノシスマイク -Division Rap Battle-) (with Subaru Kimura, Haruki Ishiya, Kōhei Amasaki, Wataru Komada, Shinichiro Kamio, Show Hayami, Kijima Ryuichi, Kento Ito, Yuusuke Shirai, Soma Saito, Yukihiro Nozuyama)
- Hypnosis Mic "Hypnosis Mic -Division Batte Anthem" (ヒプノシスマイク -Division Battle Anthem-)(with Subaru Kimura, Haruki Ishiya, Kōhei Amasaki, Wataru Komada, Shinichiro Kamio, Show Hayami, Kijima Ryuichi, Kento Ito, Yuusuke Shirai, Soma Saito, Yukihiro Nozuyama)
- Hypnosis Mic "Hoodstar" (with Subaru Kimura, Haruki Ishiya, Kōhei Amasaki, Wataru Komada, Shinichiro Kamio, Show Hayami, Kijima Ryuichi, Kento Ito, Yuusuke Shirai, Soma Saito, Yukihiro Nozuyama)
- Hypnosis Mic "Shinogi (Dead Pools)" (シノギ (Dead Pools)) (with Wataru Komada and Shinichiro Kamio)
- Hypnosis Mic "RED ZONE(Don't test da Master)" (with Wataru Komada and Shinichiro Kamio)
- Hypnosis Mic "Bayside Suicide" (with Wataru Komada and Shinichiro Kamio)
- Hypnosis Mic "HUNTING CHARM" (with Wataru Komada and Shinichiro Kamio)
- Hypnosis Mic "Reason To Fight" (with Wataru Komada, Shinichiro Kamio, Shirai Yusuke, Soma Saito and Yukihiro Nozuyama)
- Hypnosis Mic "Double Trouble" (with Ryota Iwasaki)
- A3! "Home" (with Sakai Koudai, Shirai Yusuke, Kotaro Nishiyama, Masashi Igarashi)
- Ensemble stars "Little Romance"
- Ensemble stars "Mystic Fragrance"
- Ensemble stars "Castle of my Heart"
