= Yukihiro Nozuyama =

Japanese voice actor

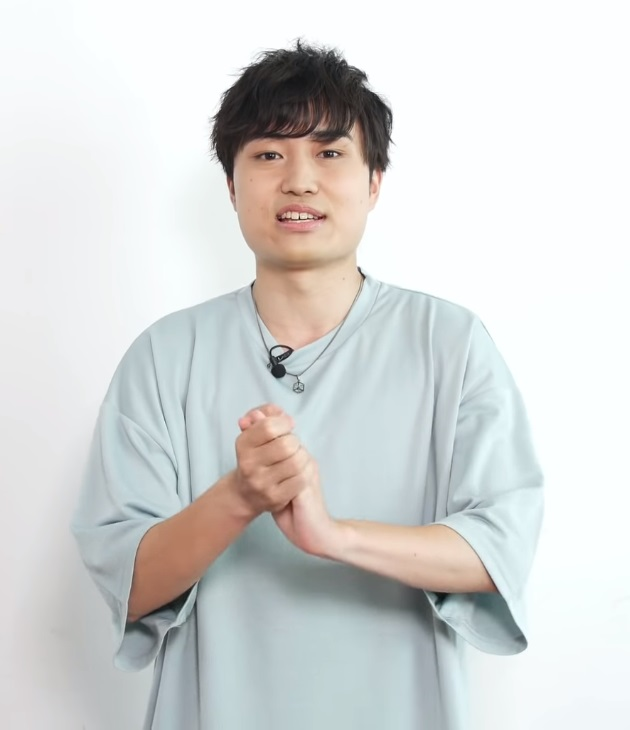
Nozuyama in 2018

Yukihiro Nozuyama (野津山 幸宏, Nozuyama Yukihiro; born December 24, 1996) is a Japanese voice actor affiliated with Stay Luck. His hometown is in Osaka.

== Biography ==
In 2017, he graduated from Osaka Amusement Media Vocational School and signed to Rush Style. Shortly after joining the company, he auditioned for the new rap battle project, Hypnosis Mic, and was cast as Dice Arisugawa. At the 13th Seiyu Awards, as part of the Hypnosis Mic cast, he accepted the singing award.

== Filmography ==
=== Anime series ===
2017

- My First Girlfriend Is a Gal (Mob B Man)

2018

- Fate/Extra Last Encore (male master)
- Devils' Line (suspect)
- Calgula (Tatsuo Takatsu, D follower, male store clerk)
- Dropkick on My Devil! (Ichiro)
- Lord of Vermilion: The Crimson King
- SSSS.Gridman
- Goblin Slayer (adventurer, new magician)
- Voice of Fox (man in sunglasses)

2020

- Hypnosis Mic: Division Rap Battle - Rhyme Anima (Dice Arisugawa)

2021

- Tokyo Revengers (Ryōhei Hayashi)
- Record of Ragnarok (Heimdall)

2022

- Tribe Nine (Kiyoshiro Haneda)
- Salaryman's Club (Ryo Natsuki)

2023

- Hypnosis Mic: Division Rap Battle: Rhyme Anima+ (Dice Arisugawa)
- Ragna Crimson (Fū)

2024

- Bucchigiri?! (Zabu)
- Go! Go! Loser Ranger! (Ranmaru Koguma)
- Goodbye, Dragon Life (Geren)

2025

- Let's Go Karaoke! (Punch Perm)

2026

- Go for It, Nakamura! (Kota Takeuchi)
- Hell's Paradise: Jigokuraku (young Gantetsusai)
- Jujutsu Kaisen (Kurourushi)
- Psyren (Kabuto Kirisaki)

=== Anime films ===
- A Turtle's Shell Is a Human's Ribs (2022), Rintarō

=== Video games ===
- Usotsuki Shangri-la (2017）
- God of Dice (2017), Grey, Howl, Dream Man
- Monster Strike (2018)
- Namuamida Butsu! - Rendai UTENA (2018)
- Cardfight!! Vanguard (2019), Izuru Shidou
- Hypnosis Mic -Alternative Rap Battle (2019), Dice Arisugawa
- Crash Fever (Taishang Laojun/Fenghou) (2021)
- Fuga: Melodies of Steel 2 (2023), Jin Macchiato
- Mobile Legends Bang Bang! (Xavier)

=== Drama CD ===
- Hypnosis Mic: Division Rap Battle (2017), Dice Arisugawa

=== Dubbing ===
==== Live-action ====
- Find Me in Paris, Henri Duquet (Christy O'Donnell)
- Forbidden Games (New Era Movies edition), Georges Dollé (Jacques Marin)
- Karate Kid: Legends, Alan (Wyatt Oleff)
- Snake Eyes, Hard Master (Iko Uwais)
- Superman & Lois, Jonathan Kent (Jordan Elsass)
- Whitney Houston: I Wanna Dance with Somebody, Bobby Brown (Ashton Sanders)

==== Animation ====
- Bad Cat, Rıfkı

== Discography ==
=== Character Song ===
Release date	Item name	Artist(s)	Song name	Note
2017
December 27	Fling Posse-F.P.S.M-	Dice Arisugawa (Yukihiro Nozuyama)	3$EVEN	Hypnosis Mic character song
2018
July 18	Fling Posse VS Matenro	Fling Posse - Ramuda Amemura (Yusuke Shirai), Gentaro Yumeno (Soma Saito), Dice Arisugawa (Yukihiro Nozuyama)	BATTLE BATTLE BATTLE	Hypnosis Mic character songs
July 18	Fling Posse VS Matenro	Fling Posse - Ramuda Amemura (Yusuke Shirai), Gentaro Yumeno (Soma Saito), Dice Arisugawa (Yukihiro Nozuyama)	Shibuya Marble Texture -PCCS-	Hypnosis Mic character songs
November 14	MAD TRIGGER CREW VS Matenro	Fling Posse - Ramuda Amemura (Yusuke Shirai), Gentaro Yumeno (Soma Saito), Dice Arisugawa (Yukihiro Nozuyama)	Shibuya Marble Texture -PCCS-（Candy Dazed remix）	Hypnosis Mic character songs
2019
April 24	Enter the Hypnosis Microphone	Division All Stars - Ichiro Yamada (Subaru Kimura), Jiro Yamada (Haruki Ishiya), Saburo Yamada (Kouhei Amasaki), Samatoki Aohitsugi (Shintaro Asanuma), Juto Iruma (Komada Wataru), Rio Busujima Mason (Shinichiro Kamio), Ramuda Amemura (Yusuke Shirai), Gentaro Yumeno (Soma Saito), Dice Arisugawa (Yukihiro Nozuyama), Jakurai Jinguji (Show Hayami), Hifumi Izanami (Ryuichi Kijima), Doppo Kannonzaka (Kento Ito)	Hoodstar Hypnosis Mic - Division Rap Battle (ヒプノシスマイク -Division Rap Battle-) Hypnosis Mic - Division Battle Anthem (ヒプノシスマイク -Division Battle Anthem-)	Hypnosis mic character songs
April 24	Enter the Hypnosis Microphone	Fling Posse - Ramuda Amemura (Yusuke Shirai), Gentaro Yumeno (Soma Saito), Dice Arisugawa (Yukihiro Nozuyama)	Stella	Hypnosis mic character songs
September 26		Division All Stars (+) - Ichiro Yamada (Subaru Kimura), Jiro Yamada (Haruki Ishiya), Saburo Yamada (Kouhei Amasaki), Samatoki Aohitsugi (Shintaro Asanuma), Juto Iruma (Komada Wataru), Rio Busujima Mason (Shinichiro Kamio), Ramuda Amemura (Yusuke Shirai), Gentaro Yumeno (Soma Saito), Dice Arisugawa (Yukihiro Nozuyama), Jakurai Jinguji (Show Hayami), Hifumi Izanami (Ryuichi Kijima), Doppo Kannonzaka (Kento Ito), Kuko Harai (Shouta Hayama), Jyushi Aimono (Yuki Sakakihara), Hitoya Amaguni (Eiji Takeuchi), Sasara Nurude (Ryota Iwasaki), Rosho Tsutsujimori (Kengo Kawanishi), Rei Amayado (Takaya Kuroda)	「ヒプノシスマイク -Division Rap Battle- +」Division All Stars	
2020
February 18	Fling Posse-Before The 2nd D.R.B-	Dice Arisugawa (Yukihiro Nozuyama)	「SCRAMBLE GAMBLE」	Hypnosis mic character songs
March 12		Division All Stars (+) - Ichiro Yamada (Subaru Kimura), Jiro Yamada (Haruki Ishiya), Saburo Yamada (Kouhei Amasaki), Samatoki Aohitsugi (Shintaro Asanuma), Juto Iruma (Komada Wataru), Rio Busujima Mason (Shinichiro Kamio), Ramuda Amemura (Yusuke Shirai), Gentaro Yumeno (Soma Saito), Dice Arisugawa (Yukihiro Nozuyama), Jakurai Jinguji (Show Hayami), Hifumi Izanami (Ryuichi Kijima), Doppo Kannonzaka (Kento Ito), Kuko Harai (Shouta Hayama), Jyushi Aimono (Yuki Sakakihara), Hitoya Amaguni (Eiji Takeuchi), Sasara Nurude (Ryota Iwasaki), Rosho Tsutsujimori (Kengo Kawanishi), Rei Amayado (Takaya Kuroda)	ヒプノシスマイク Division All Stars「ヒプノシスマイク -Division Battle Anthem-+」	Hypnosis mic character songs
August 23	「ヒプノシスマイク-Division Rap Battle- Official Guide Book」CD	Division All Stars - Ichiro Yamada (Subaru Kimura), Jiro Yamada (Haruki Ishiya), Saburo Yamada (Kouhei Amasaki), Samatoki Aohitsugi (Shintaro Asanuma), Juto Iruma (Komada Wataru), Rio Busujima Mason (Shinichiro Kamio), Ramuda Amemura (Yusuke Shirai), Gentaro Yumeno (Soma Saito), Dice Arisugawa (Yukihiro Nozuyama), Jakurai Jinguji (Show Hayami), Hifumi Izanami (Ryuichi Kijima), Doppo Kannonzaka (Kento Ito), Kuko Harai (Shouta Hayama), Jyushi Aimono (Yuki Sakakihara), Hitoya Amaguni (Eiji Takeuchi), Sasara Nurude (Ryota Iwasaki), Rosho Tsutsujimori (Kengo Kawanishi), Rei Amayado (Takaya Kuroda)	ヒプノシスマイク Division All Stars『SUMMIT OF DIVISIONS』	Hypnosis mic character songs

== Published material ==
=== Photo collection ===
- Nozuyama Yukihiro 1st Photobook "Meccha Nozuyanen"(野津山幸宏 1stフォトブック「めっちゃのづやねん。」（2019年4月10日、一迅社）
