= Ikemen Prince =

Ikemen Prince: Beauty and Her Beast
- Developer: CYBIRD
- Artist: Ishizue Kachiru
- Platforms: iOS; Android
- Release: JP: July 1, 2020; WW: August 30, 2021
- Genre: Visual novel

Ikemen Prince: Beauty and Her Beast (イケメン王子 美女と野獣の最後の恋, Ikemen Ōji Bijotoyajū no saigo no koi) is a Japanese otome visual novel developed and published by CYBIRD on July 1, 2020. It is part of CYBIRD's Ikemen series.

The game has been adapted into a stage play, drama CDs, and a web program.

== Characters ==
Emma (エマ, Ema)
Name changeable.
The protagonist (player). She worked at a small bookstore in the Kingdom of Rhodolite, but one day she was suddenly taken to the castle and chosen as "Belle" to decide the next king.

Leon Dompteur (レオン＝ドントゥール, Reon Dontūru)
Voiced by: Kazuki Kato

Chevalier Michel (シュヴァリエ＝ミシェーレ, Shuvarie Mishēre)
Voiced by: Yūki Ono

Yves Cross (イヴ＝クロス, Ivu Kurosu)
Voiced by: Yūma Uchida

Nokto Klein (ノクト＝クライン, Nokuto Kurain)
Voiced by: Takuya Eguchi

Licht Klein (リヒト＝クライン, Rihito Kurain)
Voiced by: Shoichiro Omi

Clavis Lelouch (クラヴィス＝ルルーシュ, Kuravisu Rurūshu)
Voiced by: Kenji Nojima

Jin Grandet (ジン＝グランデ, Jin Gurande)
Voiced by: Hiroki Yasumoto

Luke Randolph (ルーク＝ランドルフ, Rūku Randorufu)
Voiced by: Shion Yoshitaka

Sariel Noir (サリエル＝ノワール, Sarieru Nowāru)
Voiced by: Shō Hayami

Rio Ortiz (リオ＝オルティス, Rio Orutisu)
Voiced by: Hiromu Mineta

Gilbert von Obsidian (ギルベルト＝フォン＝オブシディアン, Giruberuto fon Obushidian)
Voiced by: Shintarō Asanuma

Keith Howell (キース＝ハウエル, Kīsu Haueru)
Voiced by: Wataru Hatano

Silvio Ricci (シルヴィオ＝リッチ, Shiruvio Ricchi)
Voiced by: Takuya Satō

Azel Radwan (アゼル＝ラドワーン, Azeru Radowān)
Voiced by: Takuma Terashima

Matias Asbrink (マティアス＝オースブリンク, Matiasu Ōsuburinku)
Voiced by: Yōhei Azakami

Kagari Amagase (カガリ＝アマガセ, Kagari Amagase)
Voiced by: Shōya Chiba

== Development and release ==
Ikemen Prince: Beauty and Her Beast was announced by CYBIRD in April 2020. The game was later released on July 1, 2020.

The game was released in English on August 30, 2021.

On December 1, 2021, Chapter 2 was released, introducing three new characters, Gilbert von Obsidian, Keith Howell, and Silvio Ricci. The theme song for Chapter 2 is Endroll (エンドロール, Endororu) by Yuito Takeuchi.

On December 21, 2022, CYBIRD officially began to add voice acting the main game.

In October 2023, three new love interests, Azel Radwan, Mathias Asbrink, and Kagari Amsagase were announced as part of Chapter 3. The theme song for Chapter 3 is Tsumugi (紡ぎ) by Do as Infinity.

In April 2024, CYBIRD released the prologue of Chapter 4. On June 28, 2024, CYBIRD celebrated the game's 4-year anniversary.

On July 1, 2025, the game celebrated its 6-year anniversary. As part of the celebration, Eternity 60 Seconds Ago (60秒前の永遠, 60-Byō mae no eien) by Kashitaro Ito was released.

== Stage play ==
Directed by Makoto Ozeki and written by Ise Naohiro, the first stage play, titled Handsome Prince Beauty and the Beast's Last Love THE STAGE Beast Leon (イケメン王子 美女と野獣の最後の恋 THE STAGE Beast Leon, Ikemen Ōji Bijotoyajū no saigo no koi THE sutēji Beast reon) was held at Theater 1010 from December 24 to 27, 2020. A stage play serving as a crossover of the Ikemen series titled Ikemen Series THE STAGE: Racing Across the World for the Celebration (イケメンシリーズ THE STAGE ～世界を駆けて、祝祭を～, Ikemenshirīzu THE sutēji ~ sekai o kakete, shukusai o ~), directed by Kosuke Hayakawa, was held at the Theater 1010 from September 24 to 28, 2022, with the cast reprising their roles.

Cast
| Character | Stage actor |
|---|---|
| Leon Dompteur | Kei Hosogai |
| Chevalier Michel | Ren Yagami |
| Yves Cross | Yoji Kondo |
| Nokto Klein | DAO |
| Licht Klein | Shoichiro Omi |
| Clavis Lelouch | Kazuma Yasui |
| Jin Grandet | Shota Onuma |
| Luke Randolph | Shion Yoshitaka |
| Sariel Noir | Yuki Tomotsune |
| Rio Ortiz | Hiromu Mineta |
| Emma | Umino Kawamura |

== Web program ==
Ikemen Prince Live Broadcast: Puri-Nama (イケメン王子生放送 プリなま, Ikemen Ōji namahōsō purina ma) began broadcast on the official Ikemen Series YouTube channnel on June 18, 2020. The program features Shoichiro Oumi as Licht Klein, Shion Yoshitaka as Luke Randolph, and Hiromu Mineta as Rio Ortiz.

== Drama CD ==
| Release Date | Title | Track Listing |
|---|---|---|
| June 9, 2021 | Ikemen Prince: Beauty and His Last Love Situation CD Yves Kross Arc (「イケメン王子 美女と野獣の最後の恋」 シチュエーションC～イヴ＝クロス編～, Ikemen Ōji: Bijo to Yajū no Saigo no Koi Shichuéshon Shīdī Ivu Kurosu Hen) | 01. Prologue (01.プロローグ, 01. Purorōgu); 02. A Morning Where I Want to Spoil You (02.甘やかしたい朝, 02. Amayakatashitai Asa); 03. A Sweet and Delicious Date (03.甘くて美味しいデート, 03. Amakute Oishī Dēto); 04. Dancing Under the Night Sky (04.夜空の下でダンス, 04. Yozora no Shita de Dansu); 05. Body Temperature I Want to Feel Forever (05.ずっと感じていたい体温, 05. Zutto Kanjetai Taion); 06. A Night I Don't Want to Sleep (06.眠りたくない夜, 06. Nemuritakunai Yoru); 07. Ending (07.エンディング, 07. Endingu); 08. Cast Talk (Yuma Uchida) (08.キャストトーク（内田雄馬）, 08. Kyasuto Tōku (Uchida Yūma)) |
| October 6, 2021 | Ikemen Prince: Beauty and His Last Love Situation CD Noctis Klein Arc (「イケメン王子 美女と野獣の最後の恋」 シチュエーションCD～ノクト＝クライン編～, Ikemen Ōji: Bijo to Yajū no Saigo no Koi Shichuéshon Shīdī Nokuto Kurain Hen) | 01. Prologue (01.プロローグ, 01. Purorōgu); 02. A Stimulating Morning (02.刺激的な朝, 02. Shigekitona Asa); 03. Lips Sweeter Than Cake (03.ケーキよりも甘い唇, 03. Kēki yori mo Amai Kuchibiru); 04. Stealing Away from Prying Eyes (04.人目を盗んで, 04. Hitome o Nusunde); 05. A Dazzling Ball (05.煌びやかな舞踏会, 05. Kirabiyakana Butōkai); 06. A Night That Won't Let Me Go (06.離してくれない夜, 06. Hanashite Kurenai Yoru); 07. Ending (07.エンディング, 07. Endingu); 08. Cast Talk (Takuya Eguchi) (08.キャストトーク（江口拓也）, 08. Kyasuto Tōku (Eguchi Takuya)) |
| May 18, 2022 | Ikemen Prince: Beauty and His Last Love Situation CD Chevalier Michel Arc (「イケメン王子 美女と野獣の最後の恋」 シチュエーションCD～シュヴァリエ＝ミシェーレ編～, Ikemen Ōji: Bijo to Yajū no Saigo no Koi Shichuéshon Shīdī Shuvarie Mishēre Hen) * | 01. Prologue (01. プロローグ, 01. Purorōgu); 02. A Morning Surprise (02. 朝からサプライズ, 02. Asa kara Sapuraizu); 03. Secret Play in a Private Room (03. 個室で秘密の戯れ, 03. Koshitsu de Himitsu no Tawamure); 04. Continuously Spoiled Date (04. 甘やかされっぱなしデート, 04. Amayakasareppanashi Dēto); 05. Intoxicated by Alcohol and Him (05. お酒と彼に酔わされて, 05. Osake to Kare ni Yowasarete); 06. A Sweet Night Where Two Melt Together (06. 2人溶けあう甘い夜, 06. Futari Tokeau Amai Yoru); 07. Ending (07. エンディング, 07. Endingu); 08. Cast Talk (Hiroki Yasumoto) (08. キャストトーク（安元洋貴）, 08. Kyasuto Tōku (Yasumoto Hiroki)) |
| October 26, 2022 | Ikemen Prince: Beauty and His Last Love Situation CD Clavis Lelouch Arc (「イケメン王子 美女と野獣の最後の恋」 シチュエーションCD～クラヴィス＝ルルーシュ編～, Ikemen Ōji: Bijo to Yajū no Saigo no Koi Shichuéshon Shīdī Kuravisu Rurūshu Hen) | 01. Prologue (01. プロローグ, 01. Purorōgu); 02. Waking Up to a Field of Flowers (02. 目を覚ましたら、そこは花畑でした, 02. Me o Samashitara, Soko wa Hanamatake Deshita); 03. Heart-Pounding (?) Date at the Lelouch Festival (03. ルルーシュ祭でドキドキ（？）デート, 03. Rurūshu-sai de Dokidoki (?) Dēto); 04. I Hate to Admit It, But I Love You (04. 悔しいけど大好きです, 04. Kuyashii kedo Daisuki desu); 05. Accepting the Love Potion (05. 惚れ薬、いただきます, 05. Horegusuri, Itadakimasu); 06. Today, Too, I Am Loved by My Partner (06. 私は今日も恋人に愛されています, 06. Watashi wa Kyō mo Koibito ni Aisarete Imasu); 07. Ending (07. エンディング, 07. Endingu); 08. Cast Talk (Kenji Nojima) (08. キャストトーク（野島健児）, 08. Kyasuto Tōku (Nojima Kenji)) |
