= Aqua Park Shinagawa =

AQUA PARK SHINAGAWA
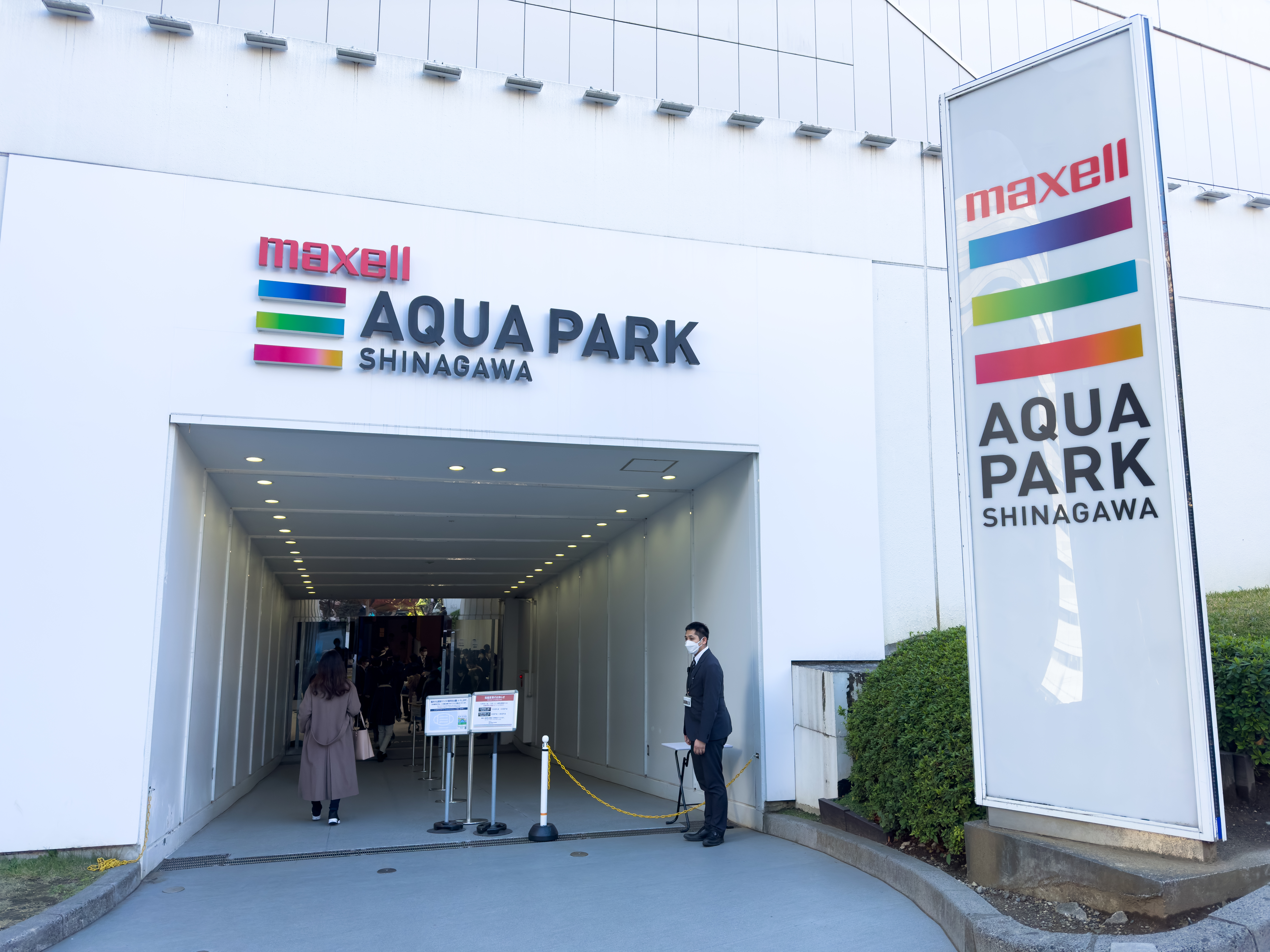
- Entrance of Aqua Park Shinagawa
- Interactive map of AQUA PARK SHINAGAWA
- 35.6278°N 139.7350°E
- Date opened: April 2005
- Location: Shinagawa Prince Hotel, Tokyo
- Land area: 11,535 m^{2} (124,160 sq ft)
- No. of animals: 18,000
- No. of species: 450
- Total volume of tanks: 4,670,000 litres (1,234,000 US gal)
- Annual visitors: 1.74 million +(2017)
- Memberships: JAZA
- Major exhibits: Dolphin show Rays tunnels fishtank
- Management: Yokohama Hakkeijima
- Public transit: Shinagawa Station
- Website: www.aqua-park.jp/en/aqua/

Maxell Aqua Park Shinagawa (ja: マクセルアクアパーク品川, Makuseru Akua Pāku Shinagawa), formerly Epson Aqua Park Shinagawa, Epson Shinagawa Aqua Stadium is a public aquarium located inside the Shinagawa Prince Hotel in Minato, Tokyo. It can be accessed from Shinagawa Station. It is a member of the Japanese Association of Zoos and Aquariums (JAZA).

== History ==
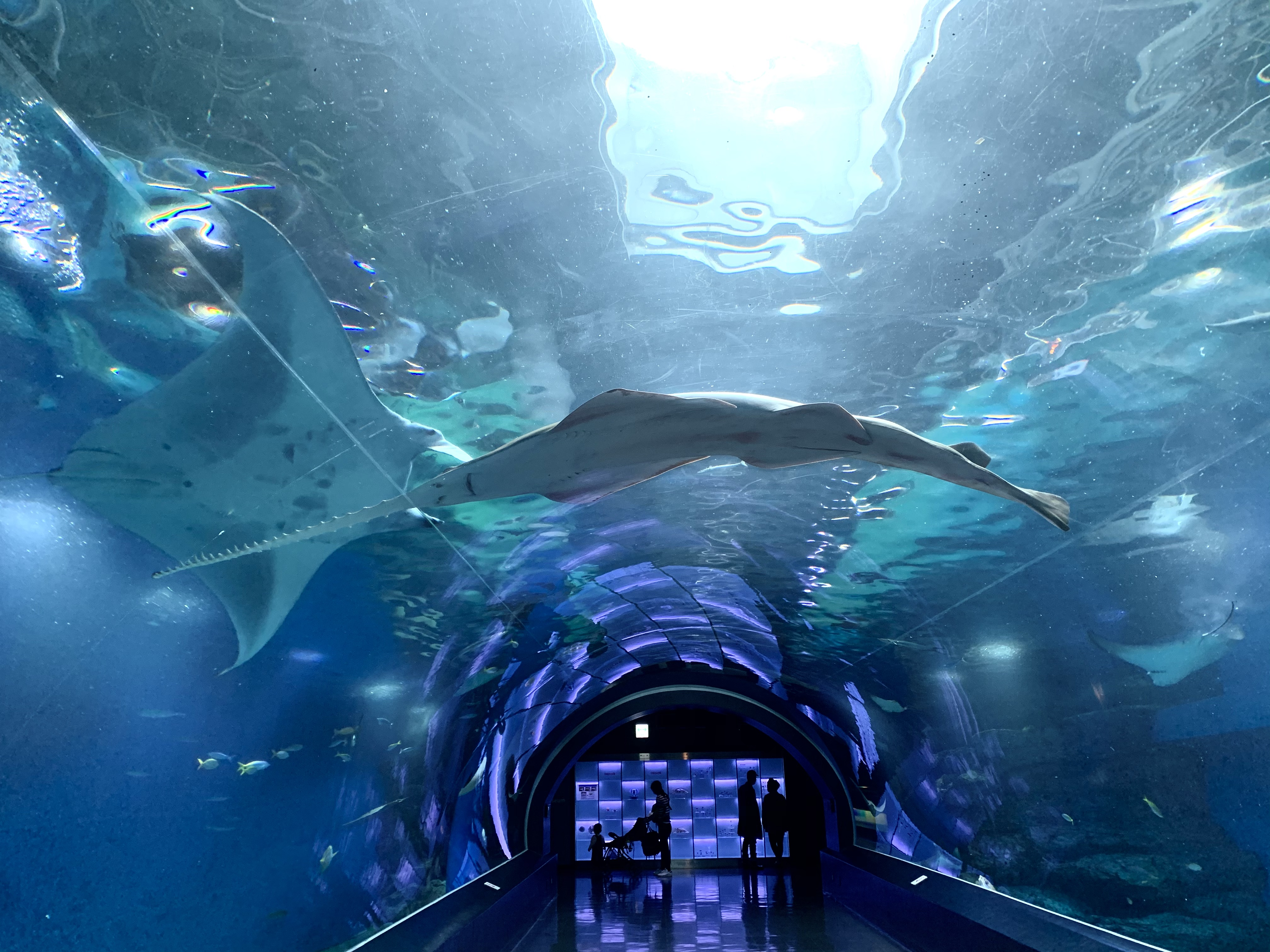
Reef manta ray and green sawfish in the aquarium's Wonder Tube

Epson Shinagawa Aqua Stadium opened on the premises of the Shinagawa Prince Hotel on April 8, 2005. The aquarium, operated by Yokohama Hakkeijima Sea Paradise, offers a variety of animal exhibits, as well as performing marine animal shows and amusement park attractions, and also hosts private events such as wedding parties. It closed for renovations on January 5, 2015. The facility's name was changed to Epson Aqua Park Shinagawa, and it reopened on July 10 the same year.

On April 1, 2016, the aquarium's name was changed to Aqua Park Shinagawa, after the naming rights contract with Epson Sales Japan expired.

On October 26, 2017, Maxell Holdings acquired naming rights under a contract. From December 1, 2017, the aquarium's name was changed to Maxell Aqua Park Shinagawa. It is a popular aquarium in the city center, and the annual number of visitors exceeds 1.5 million every year. In 2019, the number of public aquarium visitors in Japan is ranked fourth in JAZA's annual report.

== Exhibits ==
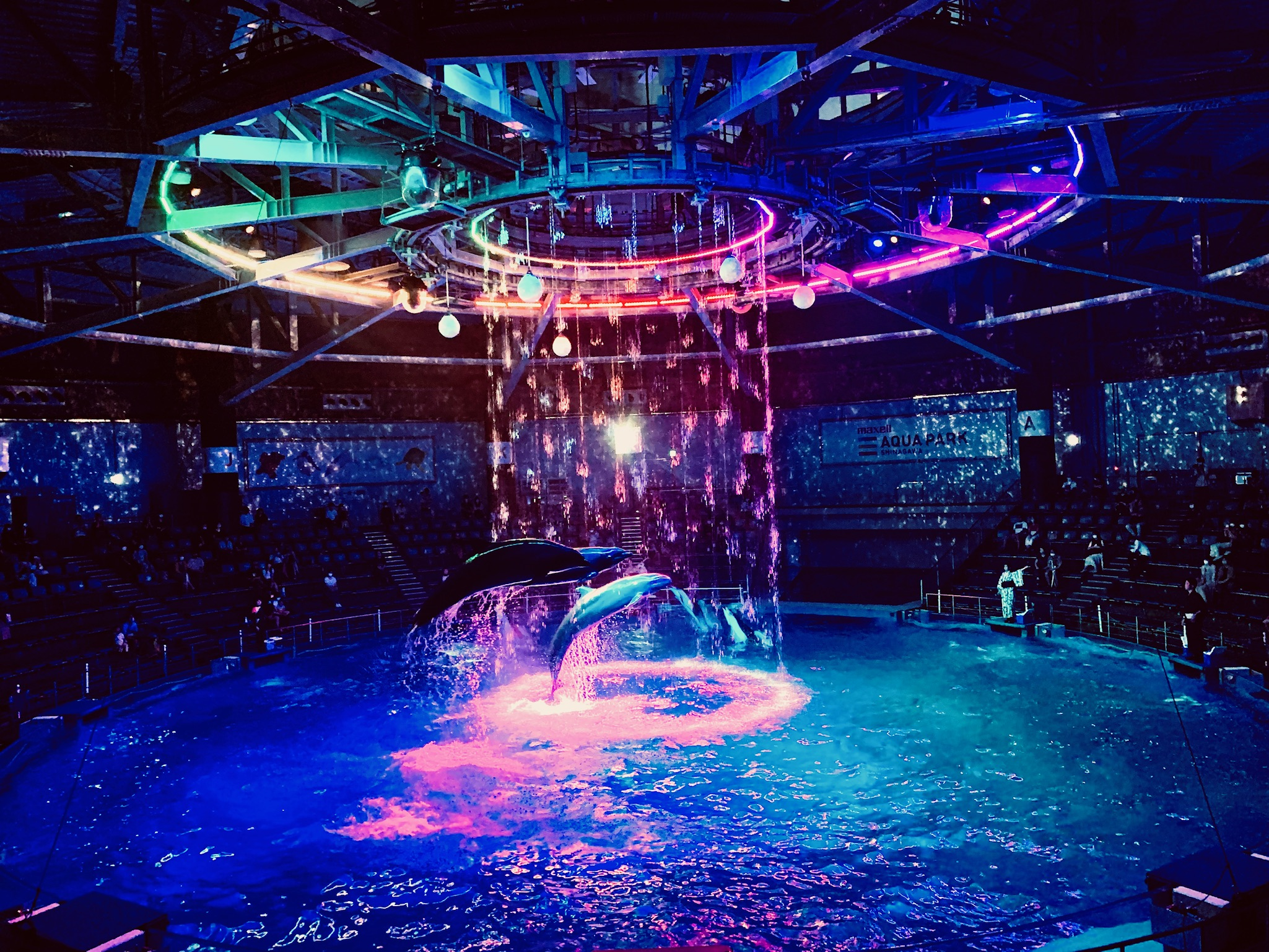
Dolphin performance in The Stadium

Since partnering with Epson and Maxell, the aquarium has incorporated projection mapping into their entrance hall and dolphin shows. The Stadium has 1,350 seats, and exhibits shows featuring performing Pacific white-sided dolphins, bottlenose dolphins, and false killer whales, that make full use of technology such as water curtains.

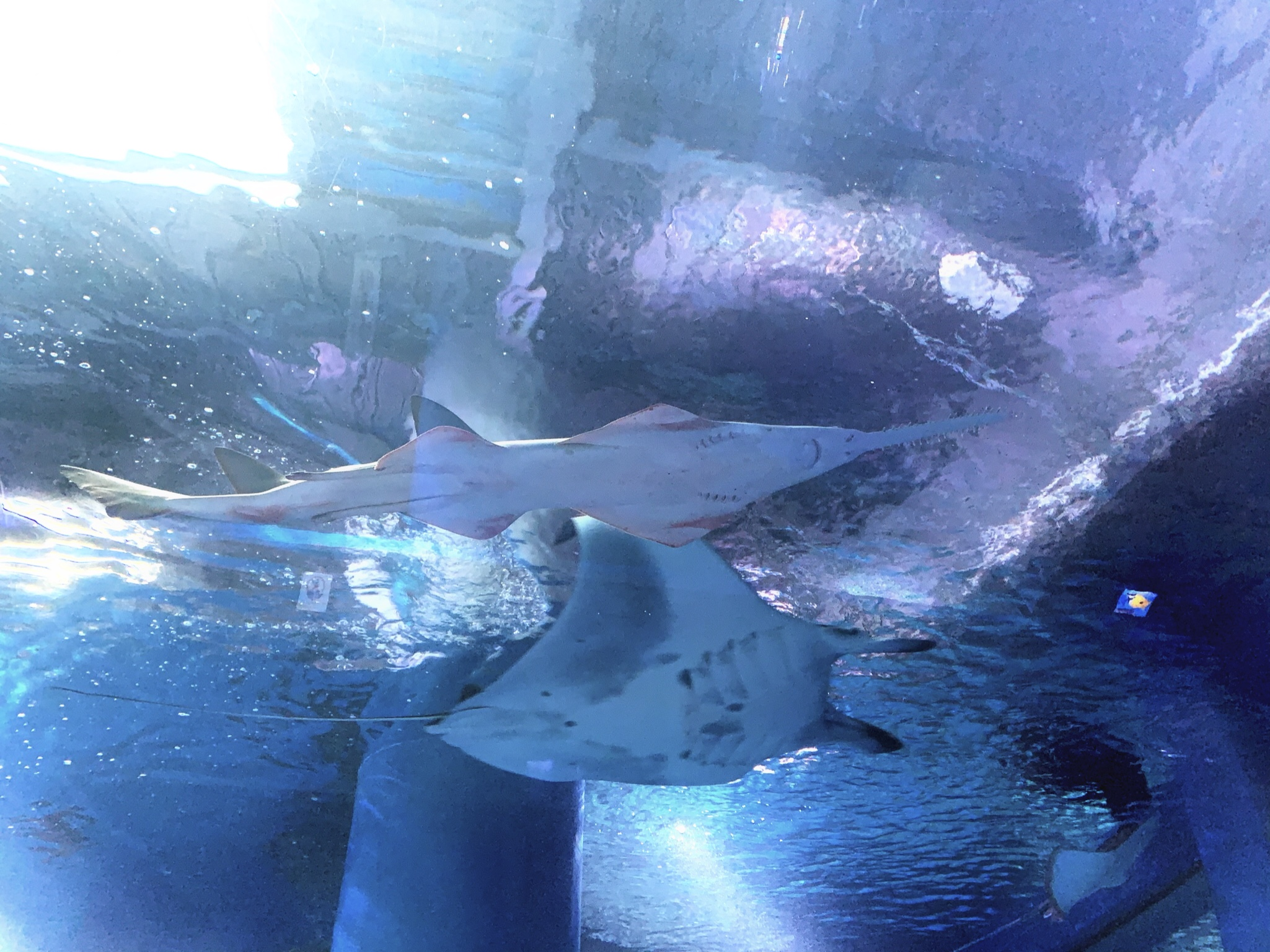
Manta ray and dwarf sawfish

Another notable attraction at the aquarium is a dome-shaped tunnel tank with a total length of 20 m (66 ft) named Wonder Tube. About 15 species of rays of various sizes, including manta rays, are housed in this tank. This aquarium is only aquarium in the world where dwarf sawfish are housed. There is also an experience corner, where guests can feed krill to manta rays.

Various marine animals are exhibited on Wild Street, including penguins, sea turtles, and fur seals. Otters and sea lions are exhibited at the small outdoor stadium, Friendly Square.

There is a hall called Stellar Ball on the grounds of the building, named by singer and composer Yumi Matsutoya. The first floor has 1,758 standing seats and 750 seats, and the second floor has 126 seats on the terrace and VIP seats.

== Facilities ==
The facility is a two-story building with attractions on the first floor, and The Stadium and tunnel fish tanks are located on the second floor.

=== Attractions ===
- Dolphin party (carousel)
- Port of Pirates (Viking boat)

=== Ground floor ===
- Park entrance
- Magical Ground
- Coral Café Bar
- Jellyfish Rumble
- Stellar Ball

=== Upper floor ===
- The Stadium
- Little paradise
- Wonder Tube
- Life Museum
- Aqua Jungle
- Wild Street
- Friendly Square
- Aqua Shop Luce

== Gallery ==
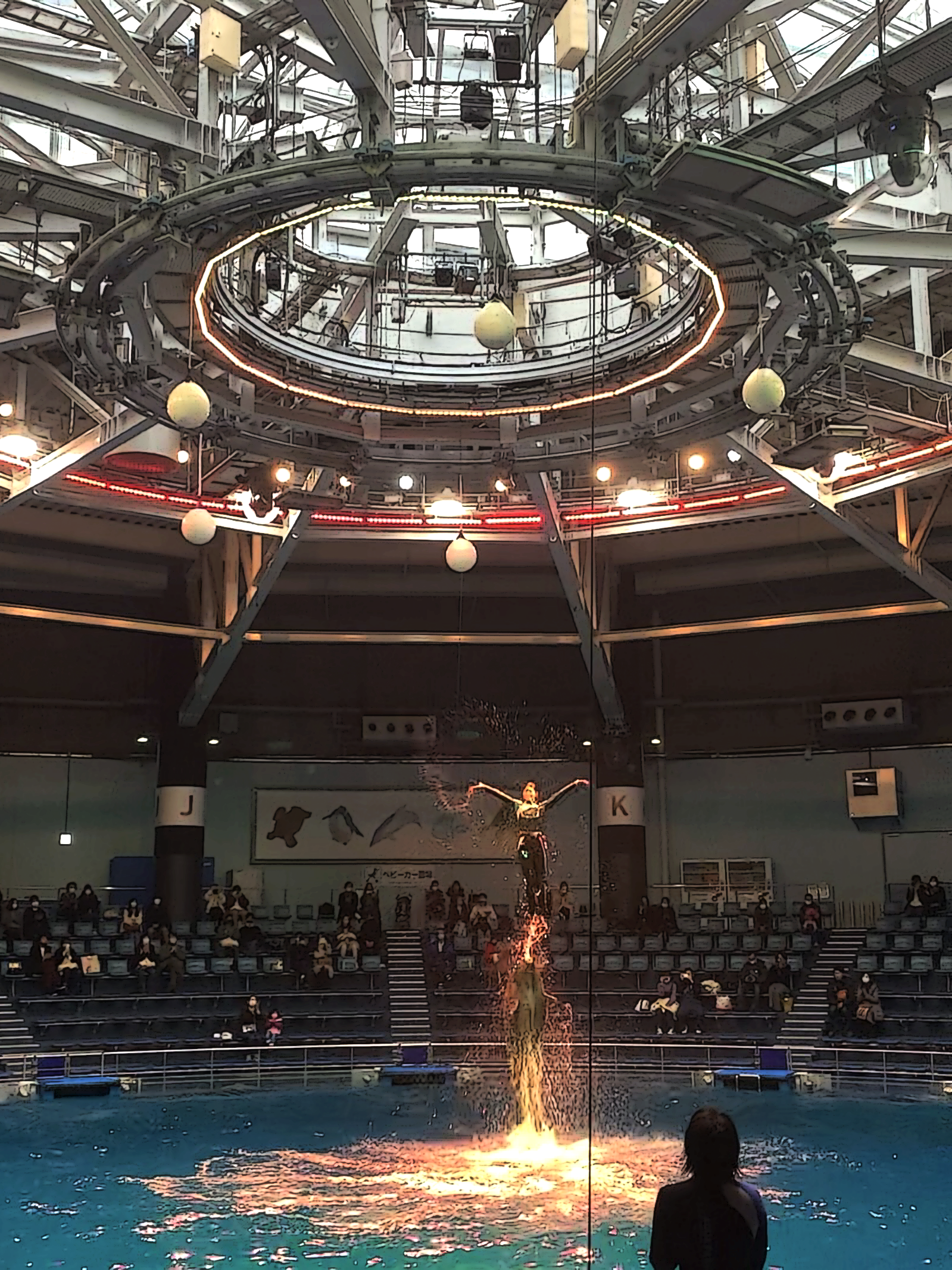

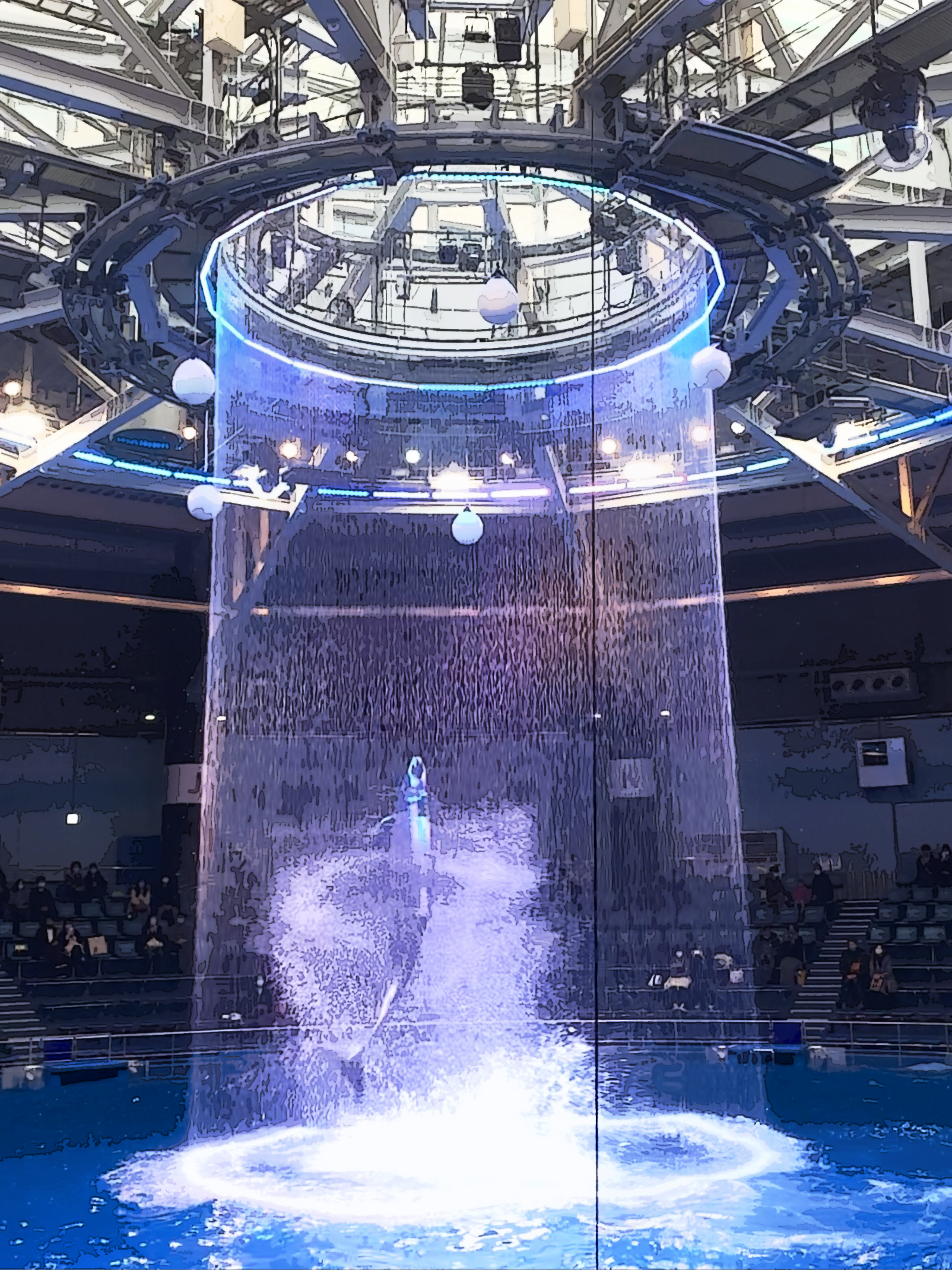

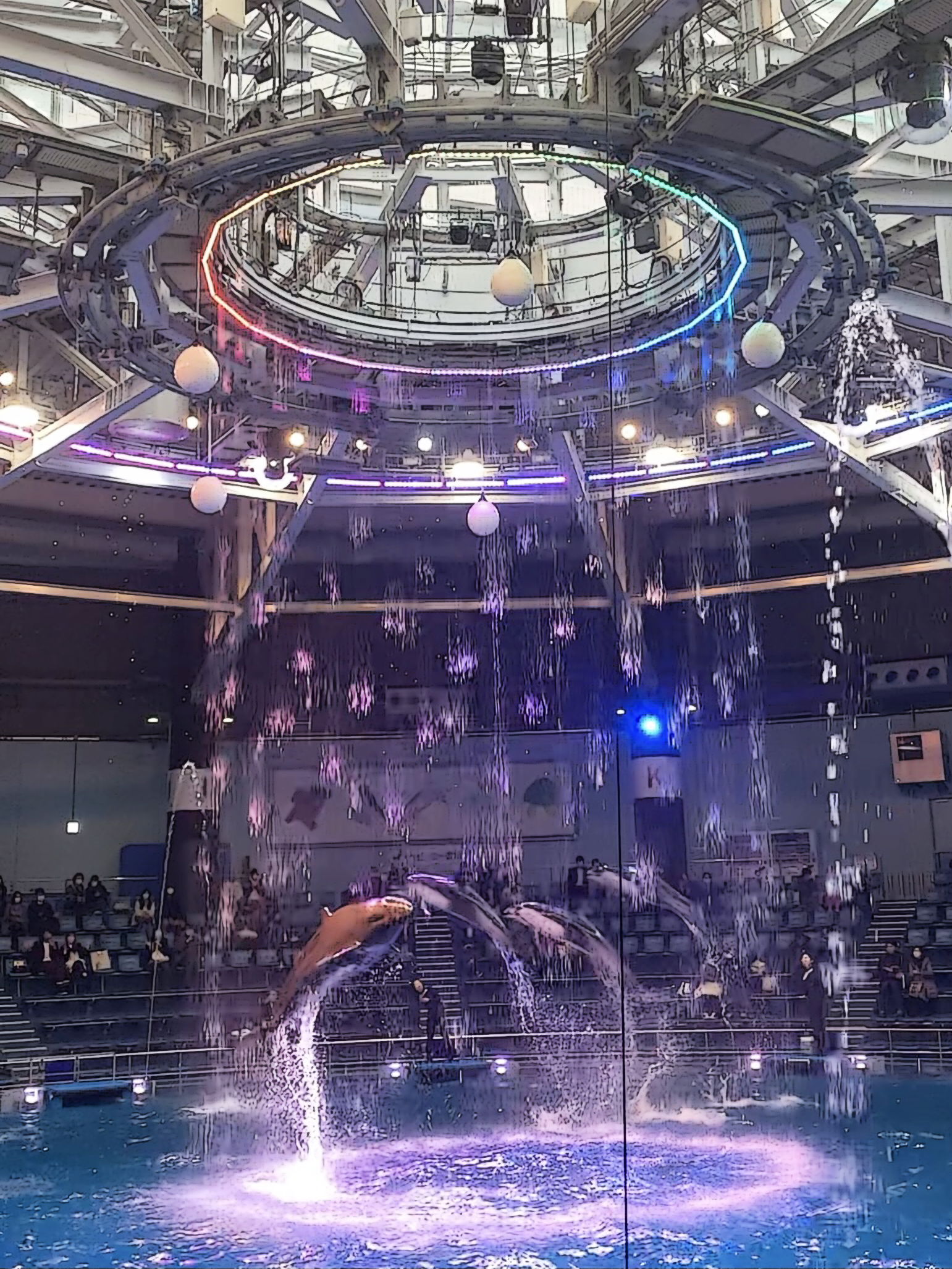

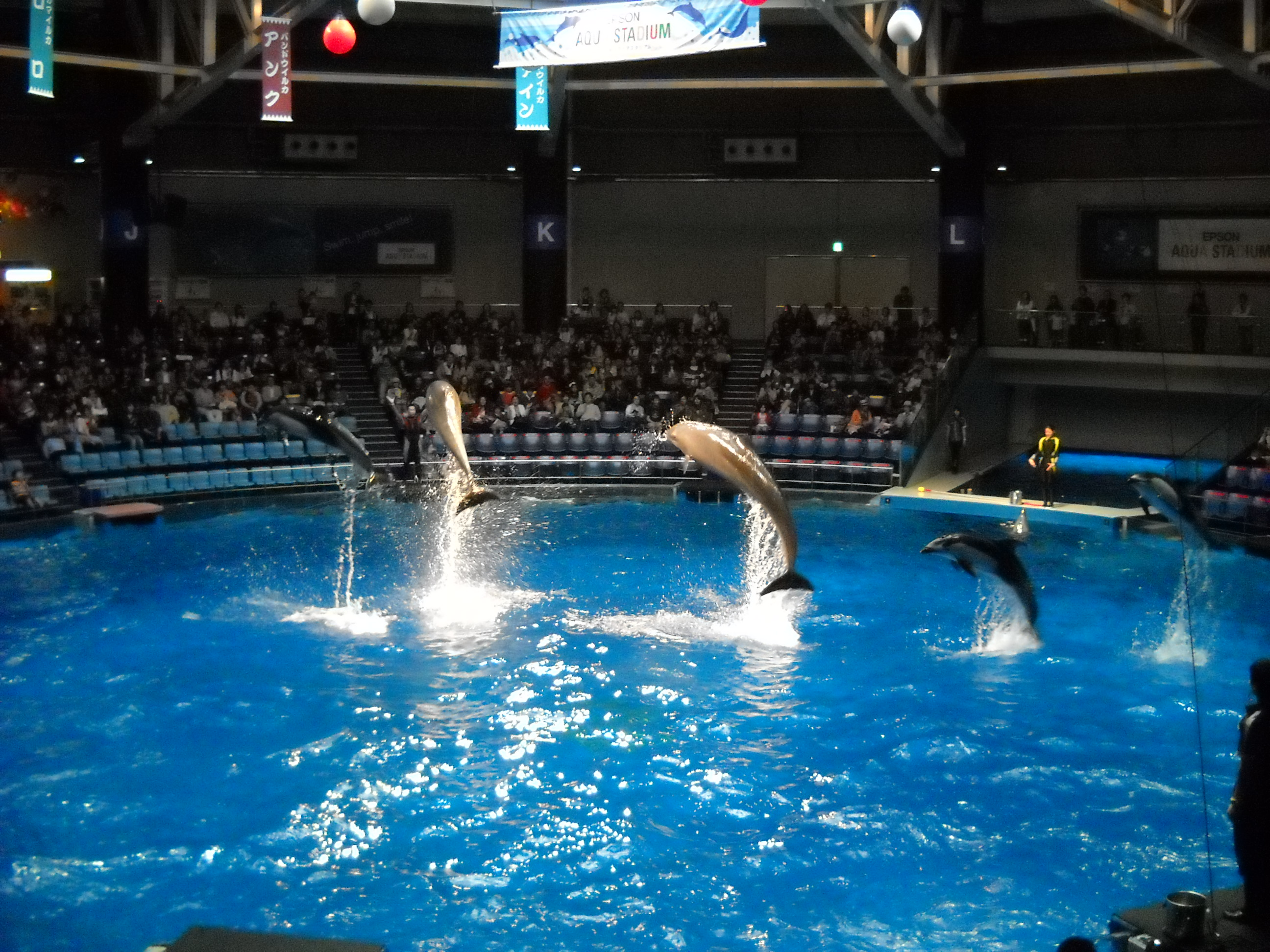

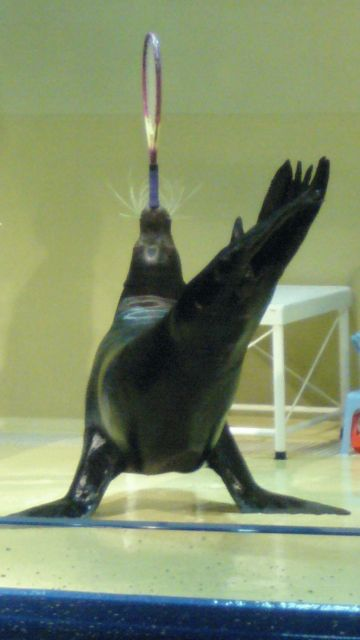

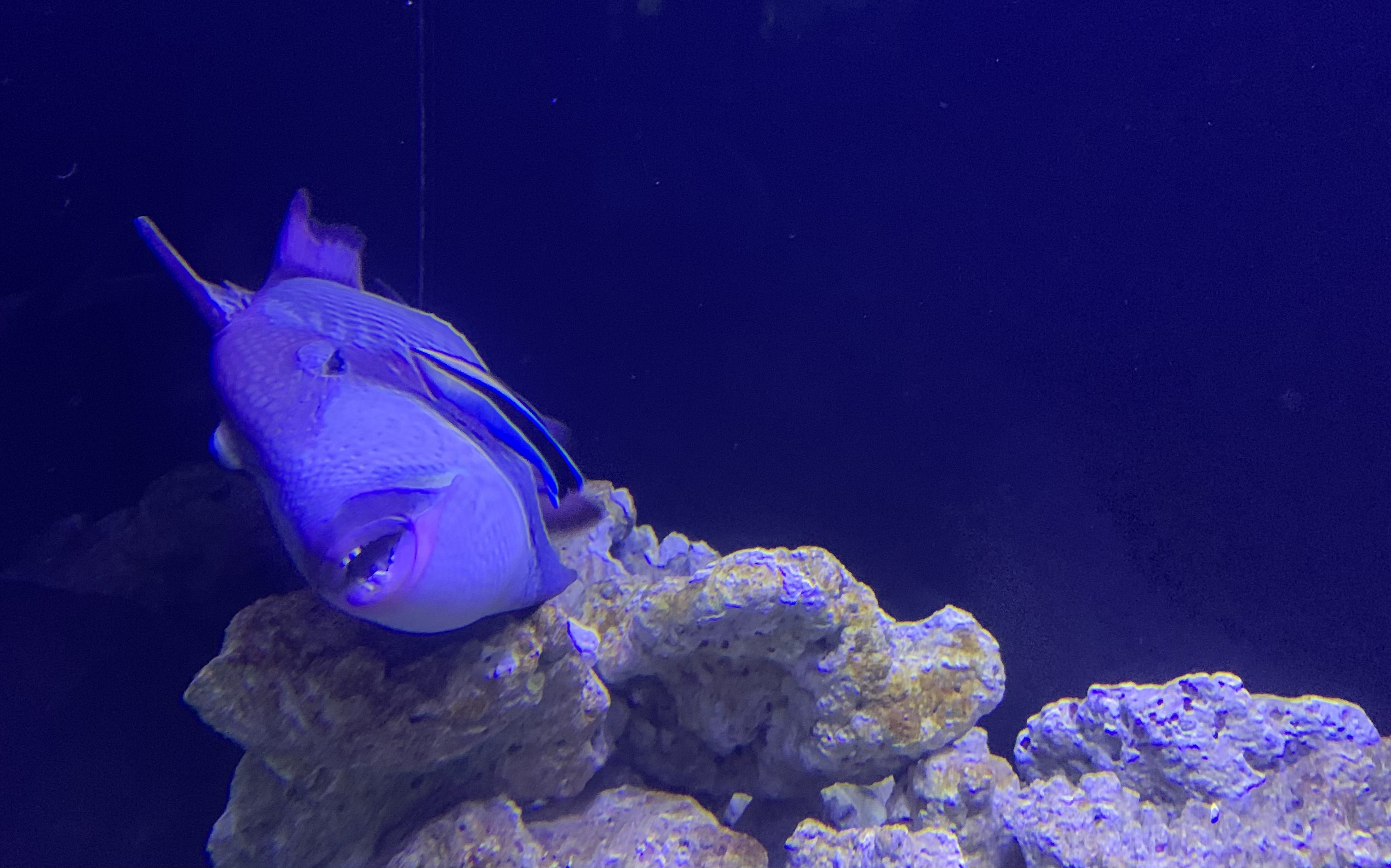

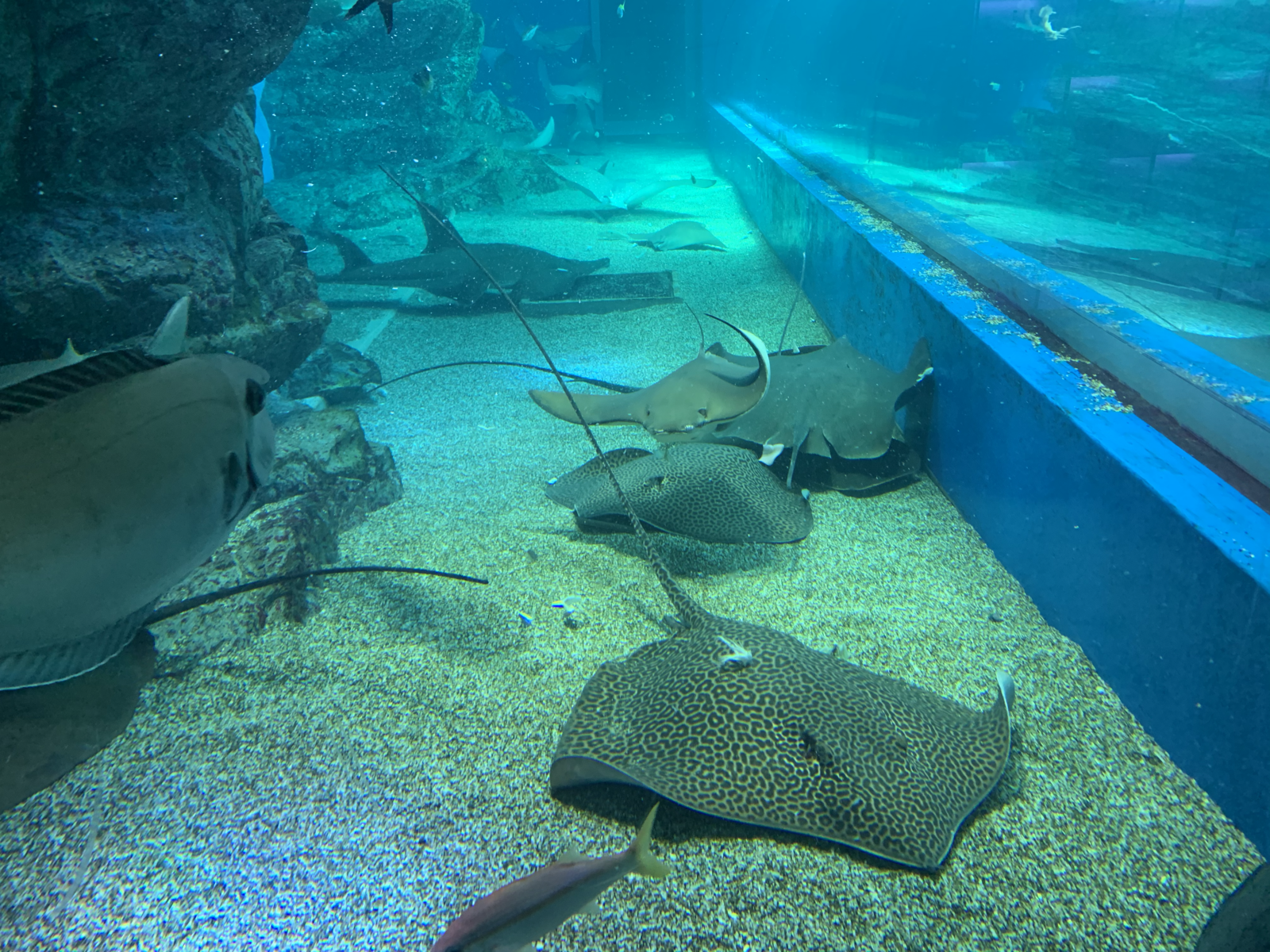

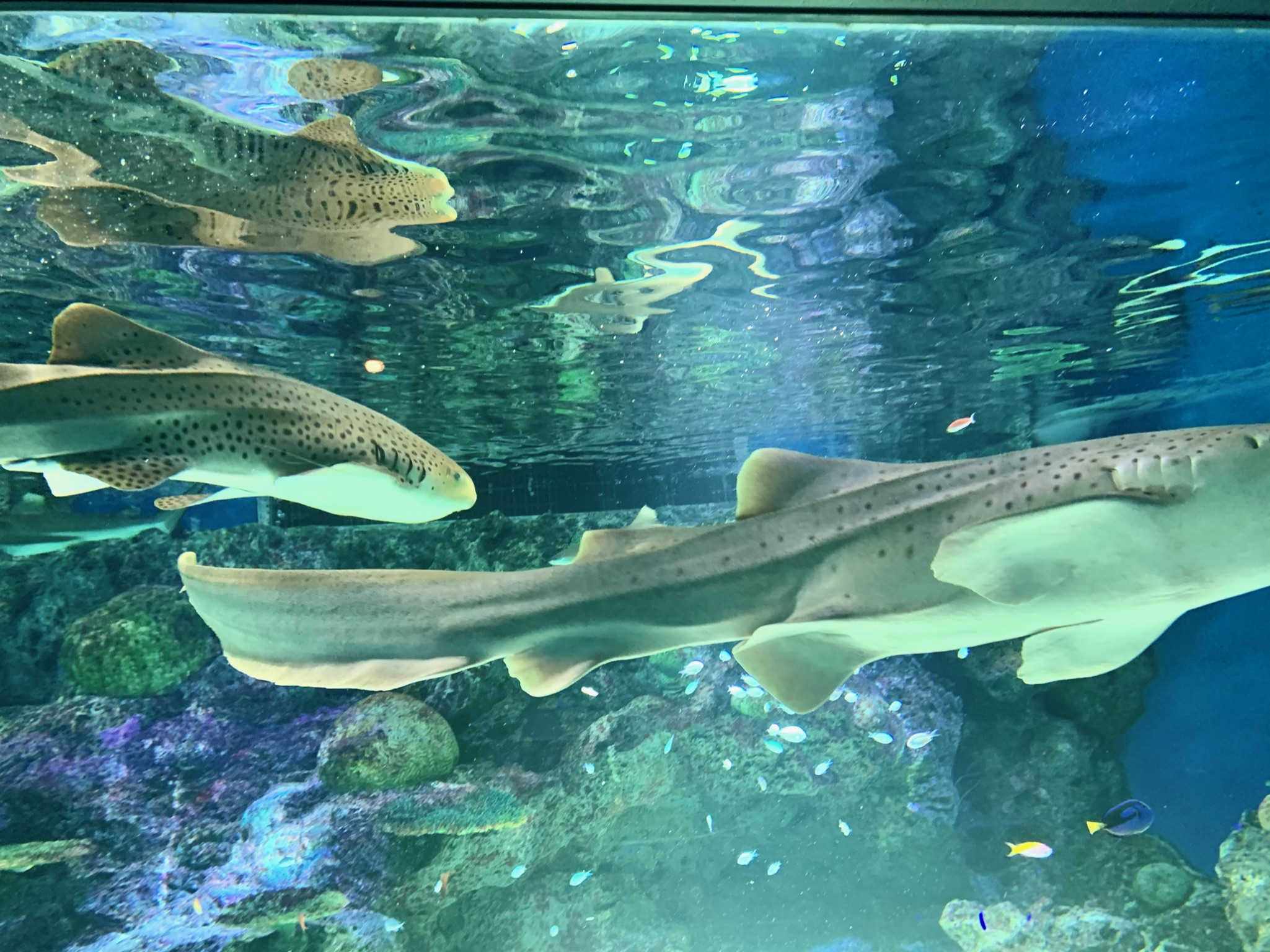

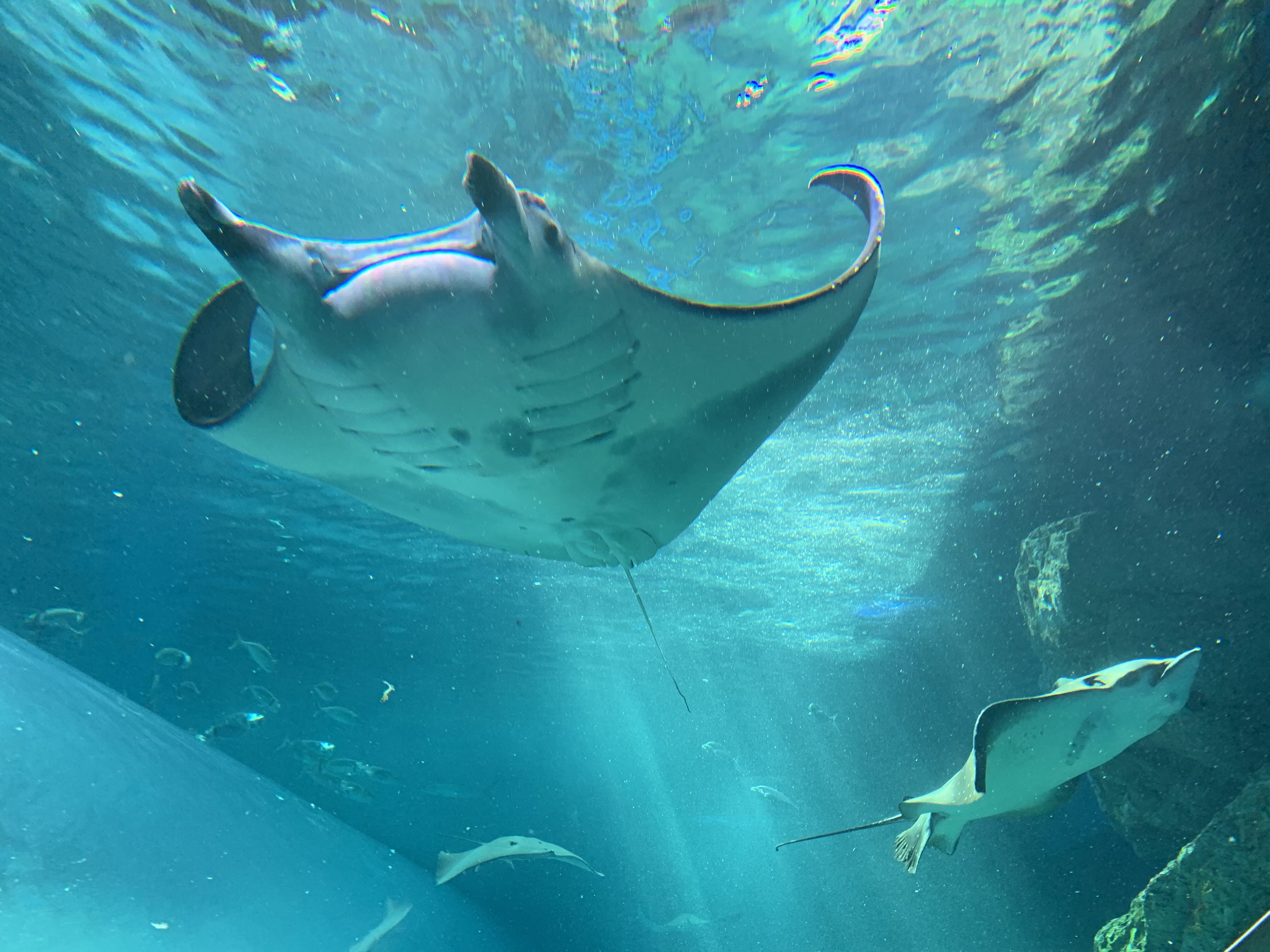

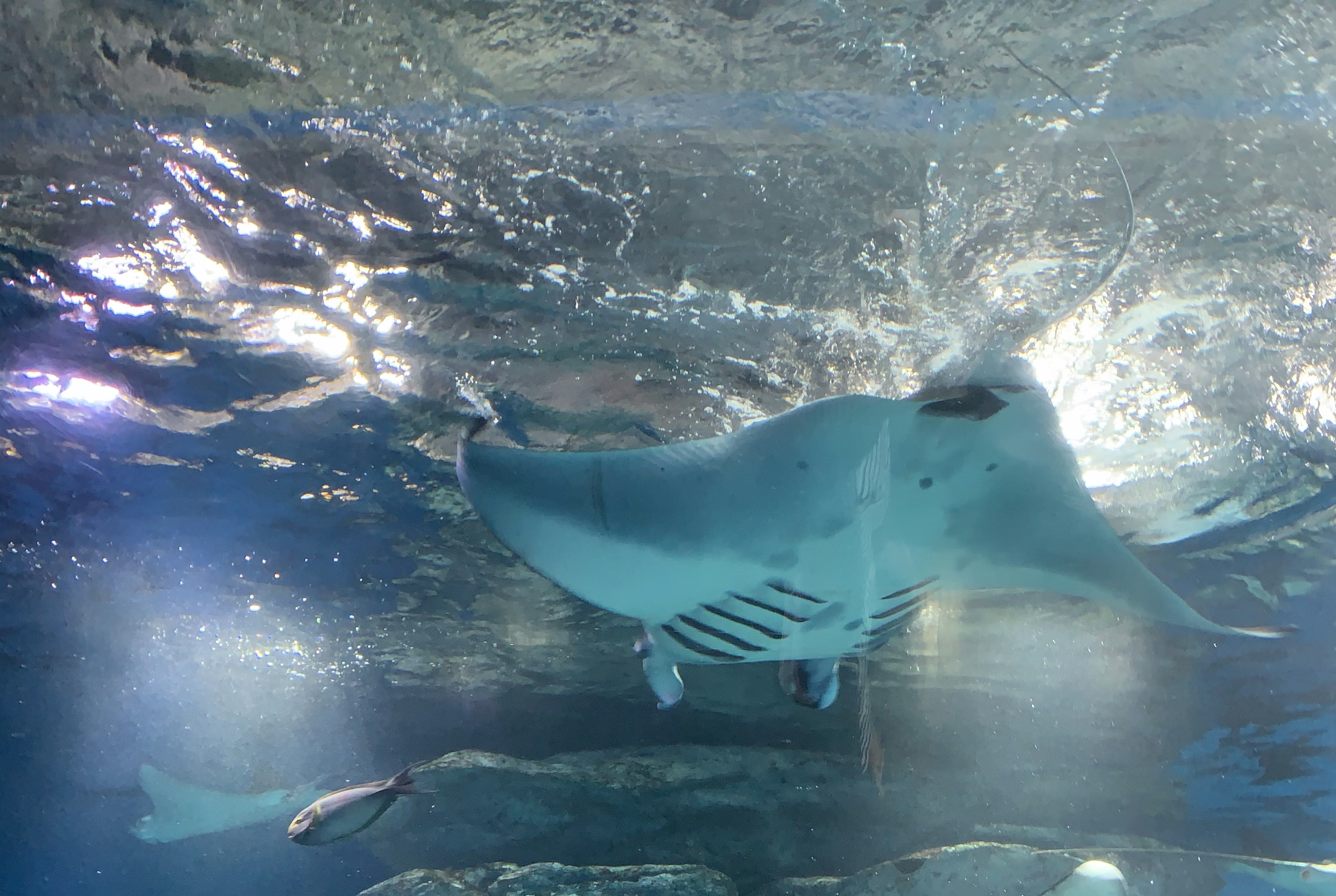

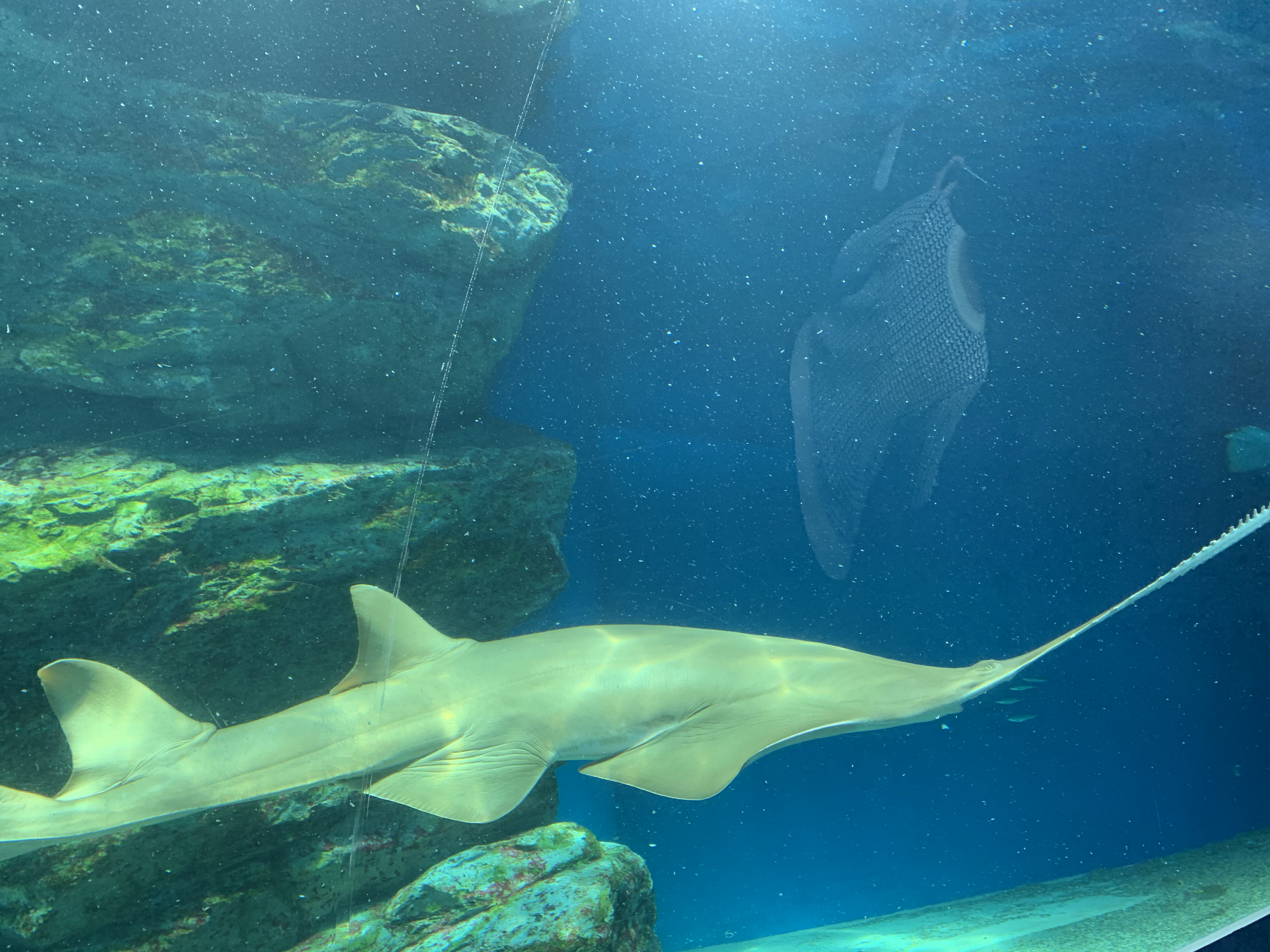

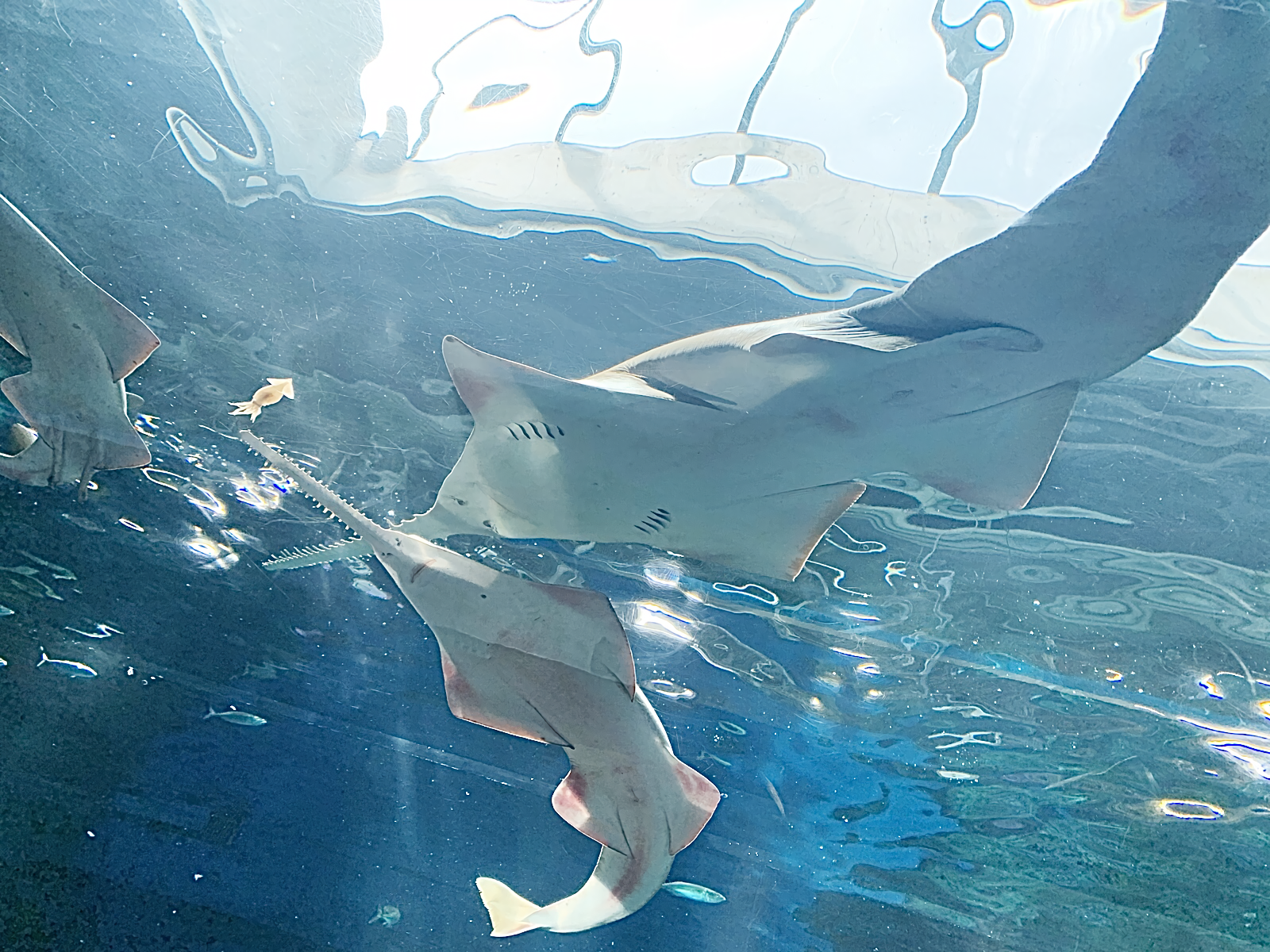

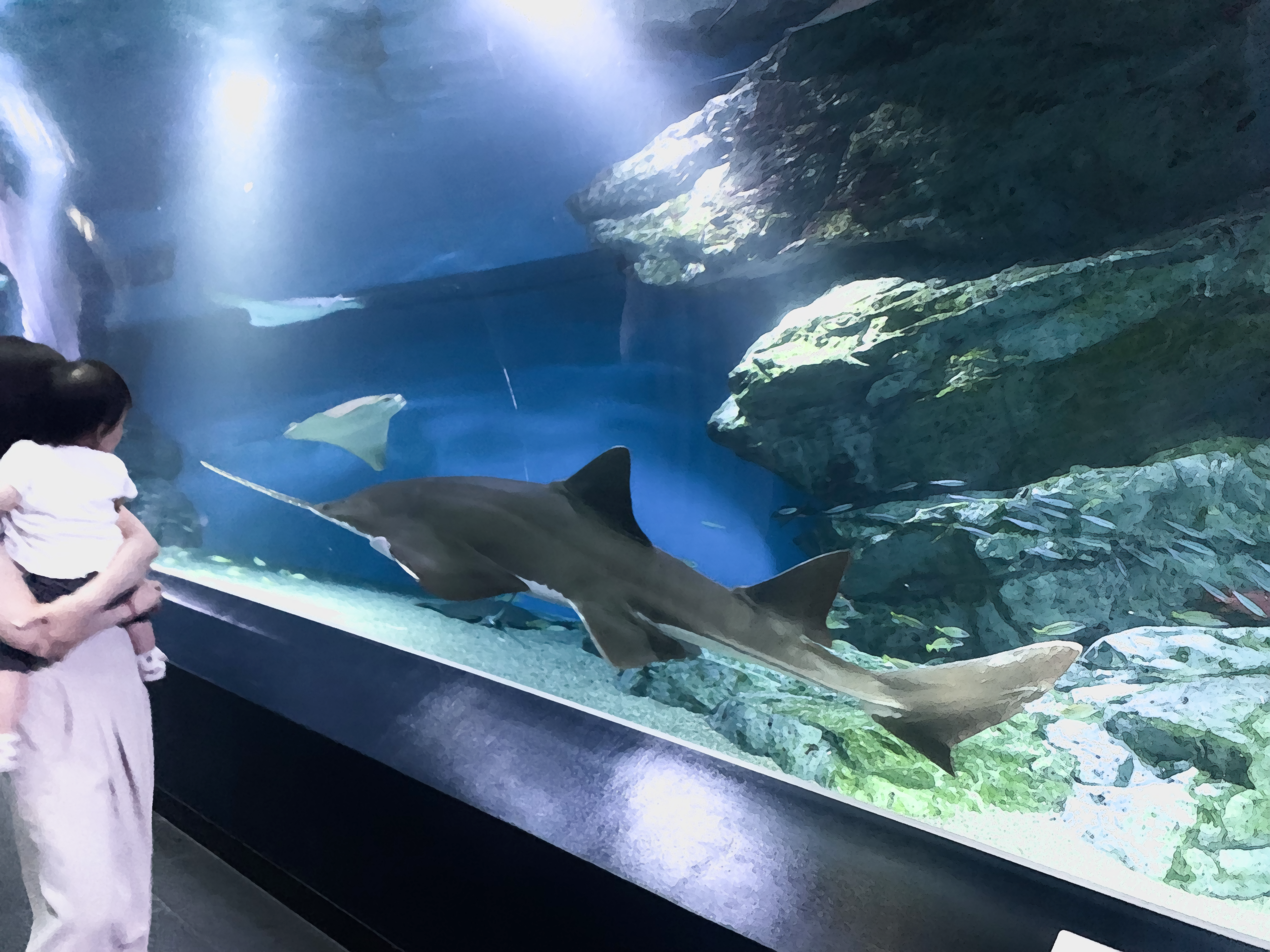

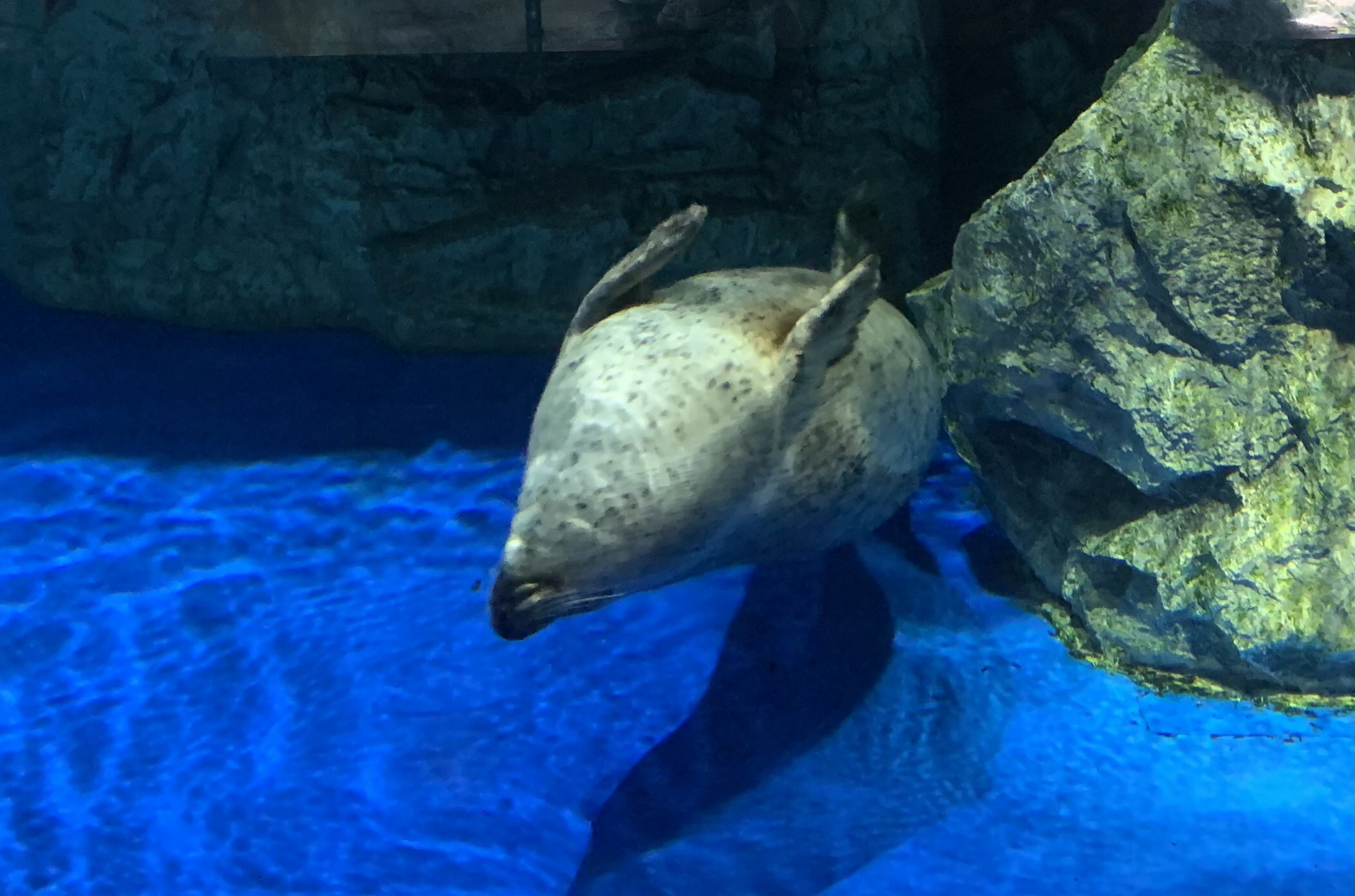

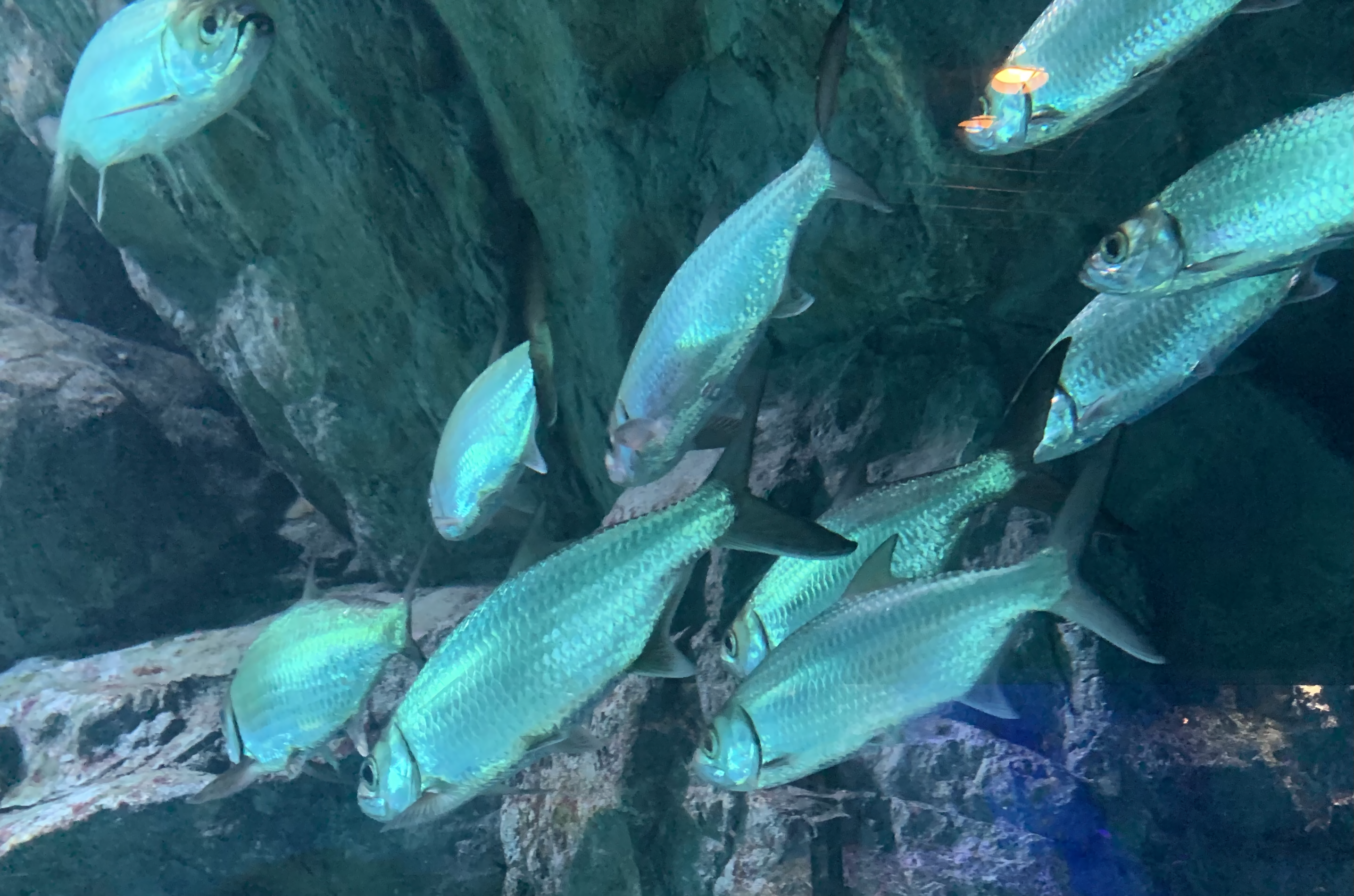

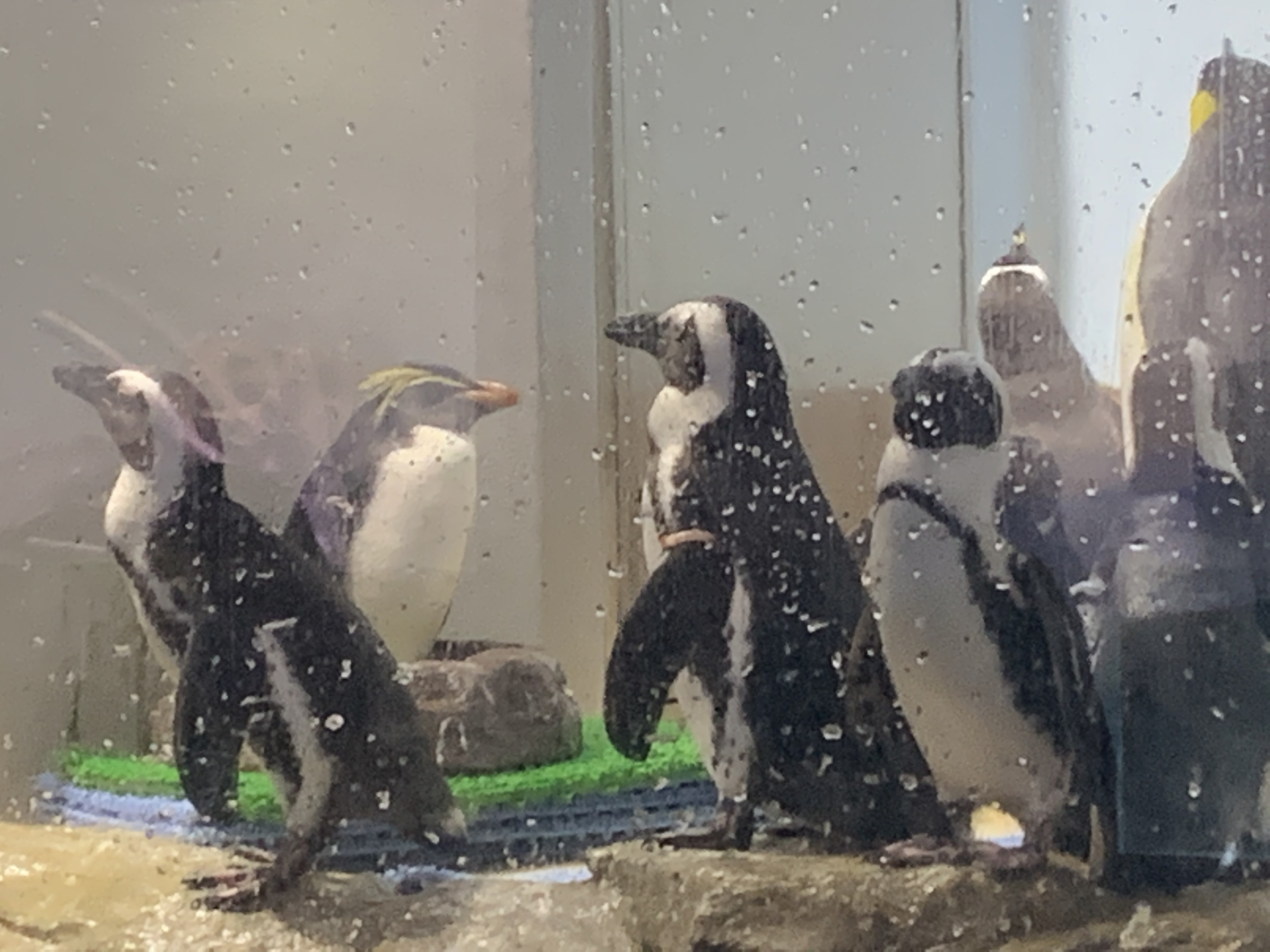

== See also ==
  - Yokohama Hakkeijima Sea Paradise
  - Sendai Umino-Mori Aquarium
  - Joetsu Aquarium
  - Xpark
  - Itabashi Botanical Garden
  - EPSON
  - Maxell
