= Hypnosis Mic: Division Rap Battle =

Japanese multimedia series

Hypnosis Mic: Division Rap Battle ヒプノシスマイク-Division Rap Battle-

Background information
- Origin: Japan
- Genres: Drama: Japanese hip hop; anime song
- Years active: 2017–present
- Label: Evil Line Records
- Website: hypnosismic.com

- Hypnosis Mic: Division Rap Battle
- Manga

Hypnosis Mic: Division Rap Battle -Before the Battle- The Dirty Dawg
- Written by: Yuichiro Momose
- Illustrated by: Rui Karasuduki
- Published by: Kodansha
- Magazine: Shōnen Magazine Edge
- Original run: December 17, 2018 – July 17, 2020
- Volumes: 4
- Manga

Hypnosis Mic -Division Rap Battle- Side B.B & M.T.C
- Written by: Yuichiro Momose
- Illustrated by: Kanie Tetsuji
- Published by: Kodansha
- Magazine: Monthly Shōnen Sirius
- Original run: December 26, 2018 – March 26, 2020
- Volumes: 3
- Manga

Hypnosis Mic -Division Rap Battle- side F.P & M
- Written by: Yuichiro Momose
- Illustrated by: Kiko Aiba
- Published by: Ichijinsha
- Magazine: Monthly Comic Zero Sum
- Original run: December 28, 2018 – present
- Volumes: 2
- Video game

Hypnosis Mic: Alternative Rap Battle
- Developer: Idea Factory
- Publisher: Idea Factory
- Genre: Rhythm game
- Platform: Android, iOS
- Released: March 26, 2020
- Manga

Hypnosis Mic -Division Rap Battle- Side D.H & B.A.T
- Written by: Yuichiro Momose
- Illustrated by: Shiro Kiko
- Published by: Kodansha
- Magazine: Magazine Pocket
- Original run: April 8, 2020 – present
- Anime television series
- Hypnosis Mic -Division Rap Battle- Rhyme Anima
- icon

Hypnosis Mic: Division Rap Battle (Japanese: ヒプノシスマイク-Division Rap Battle-, Hepburn: Hipunoshisu Maiku: Division Rap Battle) is a Japanese multimedia project by King Records under their Evil Line Records label with Yuichiro Momose as the main scenario writer. The project features eighteen voice actors and is centered on rap battles, with fans voting for their preferred team. The CDs have ranked high on mainstream music charts and the franchise has grown to include manga adaptations, stageplay adaptions, a mobile game, and an anime.

== Plot ==
After war, women have taken over ruling politics in the Chuo ward and have banned and destroyed weapons. This has caused men to fight through rap battles using Hypnosis Mics, which can be used to affect people's sympathetic nerves and influence their thought process. However, the legendary rap group, The Dirty Dawg, has split up into four groups, each representing a division of Tokyo, Japan and engaging in territorial battles using words and the Hypnosis Mics.

== Discography ==
Beginning in 2017, each group released an introductory single. In April 2018, the first Battle Season began, and each first press edition of the rap battle albums came with a voting card. Mad Trigger Crew and Matenro were the finalists. Matenro won the battle held in December 2018 and released a celebratory album titled The Champion, produced by Zeebra.

In 2019, Bad Ass Temple debuted with the album Bad Ass Temple Funky Sounds, which was produced by Nobodyknows. The song "Sōgyaran Bam" was written by Diggy-Mo.

== Lives ==
Event date	Title	Subtitle	Venue	Performers	Guest	Notes
November 4, 2017	Hypnosis Mic -Division Rap Battle- 1st LIVE@Ikebukuro Animate Girls Festival 2017		Ikebukuro Sunshine City	Subaru Kimura, Haruki Ishiya, Kōhei Amasaki, Shintarō Asanuma, Show Hayami, Yusuke Shirai		
August 26, 2018	Hypnosis Mic -Division Rap Battle- 2nd LIVE@Shinagawa《韻踏闘技大會》		Shinagawa Stellar Ball	Subaru Kimura, Haruki Ishiya, Kōhei Amasaki, Shintarō Asanuma, Wataru Komada, Shinichiro Kamio, Yusuke Shirai, Yukihiro Nozuyama, Show Hayami, Ryuichi Kijima, Kent Itō, Takahashi Chiaki	KEN THE 390, EGO	Live viewing at 11 movie theaters in Kanto
November 17, 2018	Hypnosis Mic -Division Rap Battle- 3rd LIVE@Odaiba《韻踏闘技大會》		Zepp Diver City	Subaru Kimura, Haruki Ishiya, Kōhei Amasaki, Wataru Komada, Shinichiro Kamio, Show Hayami, Ryuichi Kijima, Kent Itō, Yusuke Shirai, Sōma Saitō, Yukihiro Nozuyama, Takahashi Chiaki	Rappagariya, Cypress Ueno To Roberto Yoshino	Live viewing at 116 movie theaters in Japan
September 7, 2019	Hypnosis Mic -Division Rap Battle- 4th LIVE@Osaka《Welcome to our Hood》	Playground	Osaka-Jo Hall	Subaru Kimura, Haruki Ishiya, Kōhei Amasaki, Shintarō Asanuma, Wataru Komada, Shinichiro Kamio, Yusuke Shirai, Sōma Saitō, Yukihiro Nozuyama, Show Hayami, Ryuichi Kijima, Kent Itō, Takahashi Chiaki, Yū Kobayashi, Only on September 7: Ryota Iwasaki, Kengo Kawanishi, Takaya Kuroda, Only on September 8: Shota Hayama, Yuki Sakakihara, Eiji Takeuchi	Kuchiroro, GADORO	Live viewing at 198 buildings in Japan and 10 buildings in Taiwan
September 8, 2019	Hypnosis Mic -Division Rap Battle- 4th LIVE@Osaka《Welcome to our Hood》	Battleground	Osaka-Jo Hall	Subaru Kimura, Haruki Ishiya, Kōhei Amasaki, Shintarō Asanuma, Wataru Komada, Shinichiro Kamio, Yusuke Shirai, Sōma Saitō, Yukihiro Nozuyama, Show Hayami, Ryuichi Kijima, Kent Itō, Takahashi Chiaki, Yū Kobayashi, Only on September 7: Ryota Iwasaki, Kengo Kawanishi, Takaya Kuroda, Only on September 8: Shota Hayama, Yuki Sakakihara, Eiji Takeuchi	YamaArashi, Gaki Ranger	Live viewing at 198 buildings in Japan and 10 buildings in Taiwan
March 28, 2020	Hypnosis Mic -Division Rap Battle- 5th LIVE@Saitama《SIX SHOTS TO THE DOME》	Playground	Seibu Dome	Subaru Kimura, Haruki Ishiya, Kōhei Amasaki, Shintarō Asanuma, Wataru Komada, Shinichiro Kamio, Yusuke Shirai, Sōma Saitō, Yukihiro Nozuyama, Show Hayami, Ryuichi Kijima, Kent Itō, Ryota Iwasaki, Kengo Kawanishi, Takaya Kuroda, Shota Hayama, Yuki Sakakihara, Eiji Takeuchi, Takahashi Chiaki, Yū Kobayashi, Nozomi Yamamoto	Zeebra、CreepyNuts	Event was cancelled due to COVID-19.
March 29, 2020	Hypnosis Mic -Division Rap Battle- 5th LIVE@Saitama《SIX SHOTS TO THE DOME》	Battleground	Seibu Dome	Subaru Kimura, Haruki Ishiya, Kōhei Amasaki, Shintarō Asanuma, Wataru Komada, Shinichiro Kamio, Yusuke Shirai, Sōma Saitō, Yukihiro Nozuyama, Show Hayami, Ryuichi Kijima, Kent Itō, Ryota Iwasaki, Kengo Kawanishi, Takaya Kuroda, Shota Hayama, Yuki Sakakihara, Eiji Takeuchi, Takahashi Chiaki, Yū Kobayashi, Nozomi Yamamoto	nobodyknows+	Event was cancelled due to COVID-19.
March 29, 2020	Hypnosis Mic -Division Rap Battle- 5th LIVE@AbemaTV《SIX SHOTS UNTIL THE DOME》		AbemaTV	Subaru Kimura, Haruki Ishiya, Kōhei Amasaki, Shintarō Asanuma, Wataru Komada, Shinichiro Kamio, Yusuke Shirai, Sōma Saitō, Yukihiro Nozuyama, Show Hayami, Ryuichi Kijima, Kent Itō, Ryota Iwasaki, Kengo Kawanishi, Takaya Kuroda, Shota Hayama, Yuki Sakakihara, Eiji Takeuchi, Takahashi Chiaki, Yū Kobayashi, Nozomi Yamamoto		Aired as a special program on AbemaTV following the cancellation of the 5th live.
January 31, 2021	Hypnosis Mic -Division Rap Battle- 6th LIVE ≪2nd D.R.B≫	1st Battle -Dotsuitare Hompo VS Buster Bros!!!-	AbemaTV	Ryota Iwasaki, Kengo Kawanishi, Takaya Kuroda, Subaru Kimura, Haruki Ishiya, Kōhei Amasaki, Takahashi Chiaki, Yū Kobayashi, Nozomi Yamamoto		Originally scheduled to be held on January 30, 31, February 13, 14, February 20, and 21 in Osaka, Aichi, and Tokyo, but to prevent the spread of COVID, it was aired on Abema PPV.
February 14, 2021	Hypnosis Mic -Division Rap Battle- 6th LIVE ≪2nd D.R.B≫	2nd Battle -Bad Ass Temple VS Matenro-	AbemaTV	Shota Hayama, Yuki Sakakihara, Eiji Takeuchi, Show Hayami, Ryuichi Kijima, Kent Itō, Takahashi Chiaki, Yū Kobayashi, Nozomi Yamamoto		Originally scheduled to be held on January 30, 31, February 13, 14, February 20, and 21 in Osaka, Aichi, and Tokyo, but to prevent the spread of COVID, it was aired on Abema PPV.
February 21, 2021	Hypnosis Mic -Division Rap Battle- 6th LIVE ≪2nd D.R.B≫	3rd Battle -Fling Posse VS MAD TRIGGER CREW-	AbemaTV	Yusuke Shirai, Sōma Saitō, Yukihiro Nozuyama, Shintarō Asanuma, Wataru Komada, Shinichiro Kamio, Takahashi Chiaki, Yū Kobayashi, Nozomi Yamamoto		Originally scheduled to be held on January 30, 31, February 13, 14, February 20, and 21 in Osaka, Aichi, and Tokyo, but to prevent the spread of COVID, it was aired on Abema PPV.
August 7, 2021	Hypnosis Mic -Division Rap Battle- 7th LIVE《SUMMIT OF DIVISIONS》		Pia Arena MM	Subaru Kimura, Haruki Ishiya, Kōhei Amasaki, Shintarō Asanuma, Wataru Komada, Shinichiro Kamio, Yusuke Shirai, Sōma Saitō, Yukihiro Nozuyama, Show Hayami, Ryuichi Kijima, Kent Itō, Ryota Iwasaki, Kengo Kawanishi, Takaya Kuroda, Shota Hayama, Yuki Sakakihara, Eiji Takeuchi, Takahashi Chiaki, Yū Kobayashi, Nozomi Yamamoto	Dragon Ash, Reol	Live viewing was broadcast at movie theaters all over Japan, and it was aired live on ABEMA PPV ONLINE LIVE.
August 8, 2021	Hypnosis Mic -Division Rap Battle- 7th LIVE《SUMMIT OF DIVISIONS》		Pia Arena MM	Subaru Kimura, Haruki Ishiya, Kōhei Amasaki, Shintarō Asanuma, Wataru Komada, Shinichiro Kamio, Yusuke Shirai, Sōma Saitō, Yukihiro Nozuyama, Show Hayami, Ryuichi Kijima, Kent Itō, Ryota Iwasaki, Kengo Kawanishi, Takaya Kuroda, Shota Hayama, Yuki Sakakihara, Eiji Takeuchi, Takahashi Chiaki, Yū Kobayashi, Nozomi Yamamoto	Dragon Ash, Scha Dara Parr	Live viewing was broadcast at movie theaters all over Japan, and it was aired live on ABEMA PPV ONLINE LIVE.

== Media ==
=== Game ===
On September 9, 2018, a smartphone game Hypnosis Mic: Alternative Rap Battle was announced by video game developer and publisher Idea Factory. The game was slated for a December 2019 release, but was then announced to be delayed until March 2020 to improve the quality of the app. Kazui is the character designer for the smartphone game, while Yuichiro Momose will be the scenario writer. The game was officially released March 26, 2020, on iOS and Android. The game's original story is set in the "Alternative Rap Battle" held by the Chuo Ward. The main character (player) starts as an apprentice DJ participating in the alternative rap battle. In the game, you can also play a rhythm game called "KILLER SCRATCH !!" and play Hypnosis Mic songs.

=== Manga ===
Original work by EVIL LINE RECORDS, Scenario written by Momose Yūichirō.

==== Hypnosis Mic -Before the Battle- The Dirty Dawg ====
Hypnosis Mic -Before the Battle- The Dirty Dawg, which focuses on all the former members of The Dirty Dawg, began serializing in Kodansha's Shonen Magazine Edge January 2019 issue (released December 17, 2018) to the August 2020 issue (released on July 17, 2020), and was illustrated by Rui Karasuduki.

No.	Japanese release date	Japanese ISBN
1	May 30, 2019	978-4-06-516111-1 (Regular Edition); ISBN 978-4-06-516123-4 (Limited Edition with CD)
2	October 17, 2019	978-4-06-517425-8 (Regular Edition); ISBN 978-4-06-517626-9 (Limited Edition with Booklet and Clear Sheet)
3	April 17, 2020	978-4-06-519312-9 (Regular Edition); ISBN 978-4-06-519314-3 (Limited Edition with CD)
4	October 16, 2020	978-4-06-521091-8 (Regular Edition); ISBN 978-4-06-521092-5 (Limited Edition with Booklet and Big Keychain)

==== Hypnosis Mic -Division Rap Battle- Side B.B. & M.T.C ====
Hypnosis Mic -Division Rap Battle- Side B.B. & M.T.C, which focuses on Buster Bros!!! and Mad Trigger Crew, was serialized in Kodansha's Monthly Shōnen Sirius from the February 2019 issue (released on December 26, 2018) to the May 2020 issue (released on March 26, 2020).

No.	Japanese release date	Japanese ISBN
1	June 25, 2019	978-4-06-516170-8 (Regular Edition); ISBN 978-4-06-516099-2 (Limited Edition with CD)
2	December 12, 2019	978-4-06-516170-8 (Regular Edition); ISBN 978-4-06-516099-2 (Limited Edition with Special Art Book and Bromide)
3	April 24, 2020; April 27, 2020	978-4-06-519435-5 (Regular Edition); ISBN 978-4-06-519425-6 (Limited Edition with CD)

==== Hypnosis Mic -Division Rap Battle- Side F.P & M ====
Hypnosis Mic -Division Rap Battle- Side F.P & M, which focuses on Fling Posse and Matenro, began running in Ichijinsha's Monthly Comic Zero Sum from the February 2019 issue (released on December 28, 2018) to the April 2020 issue (released on February 28, 2020).

No.	Japanese release date	Japanese ISBN
1	June 25, 2019	978-4-75-803433-3 (Regular Edition); ISBN 978-4-75-803434-0 (Limited Edition with CD)
2	December 12, 2019	978-4-75-803471-5 (Regular Edition); ISBN 978-4-75-803470-8 (Limited Edition with Special Art Book and Bromide)
3	April 25, 2020	978-4-75-803500-2 (Regular Edition); ISBN 978-4-75-803501-9 (Limited Edition with CD)

==== Hypnosis Mic -Division Rap Battle- side D.H & B.A.T ====
Hypnosis Mic -Division Rap Battle- side D.H & B.A.T, which focuses on the Osaka Division Dotsuitare Hompo and Nagoya Division Bad Ass Temple, began serialization in Kodansha's Magazine Pocket app on April 8, 2020.

No.	Japanese release date	Japanese ISBN
1	October 16, 2020	978-4-06-521022-2 (Regular Edition); ISBN 978-4-06-521024-6 (Limited Edition with CD)
2	December 17, 2020	978-4-06-521666-8 (Regular Edition); ISBN 978-4-06-521667-5 (Limited Edition with Booklet)
3	March 17, 2021	978-4-06-522650-6 (Regular Edition); ISBN 978-4-06-522651-3 (Limited Edition with CD)
4	September 17, 2021	978-4-06-524850-8 (Regular Edition); ISBN 978-4-06-524851-5 (Limited Edition with CD Case)

==== Hypnosis Mic -Division Rap Battle- Dawn of Divisions ====
Hypnosis Mic -Division Rap Battle- Dawn of Divisions by Rui Karasuduki. Serialized in Kodansha's Shōnen Magazine Edge from January 17, 2021, to June 17, 2022.

No.	Japanese release date	Japanese ISBN
1	October 15, 2021	978-4-06-525024-2 (Regular Edition); ISBN 978-4-06-525023-5 (Limited Edition with CD)

==== Hypnosis Mic -Division Rap Battle- Side B.B and M.T.C + ====
Hypnosis Mic -Division Rap Battle- Side B.B and M.T.C + began serializing in Kodansha's Monthly Shōnen Sirius from the March 2021 issue (released January 26, 2021).

No.	Japanese release date	Japanese ISBN
1	September 22, 2021	978-4-06-525007-5 (Regular Edition); ISBN 978-4-06-525006-8 (Limited Edition with CD)

==== Hypnosis Mic -Division Rap Battle- Side F.P and M + ====
Hypnosis Mic -Division Rap Battle- Side F.P and M + began serializing in Ichijinsha's Monthly Comic Zero Sum from the March 2021 issue (released January 28, 2021).

No.	Japanese release date	Japanese ISBN
1	September 22, 2021	978-4-7580-3652-8 (Regular Edition); ISBN 978-4-7580-3651-1 (Limited Edition with CD)

=== Stage plays ===
"Hypnosismic -Division Rap Battle-" began performing from November 2019 under the title of Rule the Stage, also known as Hypste (ヒプステ).

All plays were directed by Gō Ueki and written by Shinjirō Kaneda, with Yamadera Kouichi in charge of narration.

=== Main Cast ===
Ikebukuro Division Buster Bros!!!

- Ichiro Yamada:
  - Akira Takano (2019-2023)
  - Ryoga Ishikawa (2024-present)
- Jiro Yamada:
  - Shōta Matsuda (2019-2023)
  - Kennosuke Matsuoka (2024-present)
- Saburo Yamada:
  - Ryuto Akishima (2019-2021)
  - Ryunosuke Nagashima (2022-2023)
  - Yukia Takano (2024-present)

Yokohama Division MAD TRIGGER CREW

- Samatoki Aohitsugi:
  - Alan Abe (2019-2023)
  - Takuya Uehara (2024-present)
- Jyuto Iruma:
  - Kenta Mizue (2019-2023)
  - YUKI (2024-present)
- Rio Mason Busujima:
  - Yūki Byrnes (2019-2023)
  - Takumi Masunaga (2024-present)

Shibuya Division Fling Posse

- Ramuda Amemura:
  - Ryo Sekoguchi (2020-2021)
  - Kentaro Yasui, (2022-2023)
  - Junpei Mitsui (2024-present)
- Gentaro Yumeno:
  - Takahisa Maeyama (2020-2021)
  - Ryuichirō Sakata (2022-2023)
  - Shunto Imai (2024-present)
- Dice Arisugawa:
  - Ryo Takizawa (2020-2023)
  - Taiyu Kitsuya (2024-present)

Shinjuku Division Matenro

- Jakurai Jinguji:
  - Taiyo Ayukawa (2020-2023)
  - Allen Kohatsu (2024-present)
- Hifumi Izanami:
  - Hirofumi Araki (2020-2023)
  - Yūto Ando (2024-present)
- Doppo Kannonzaka:
  - Kodai Miyagi (2020-2021)
  - Takuya Ide (2022-2023)
  - Yūki Nakashita (2024-present)

Osaka Division Dotsuitare Hompo

- Sasara Nurude:
  - Yoshihiko Aramaki (2020-2023)
  - Ryusei Kitade (2024-present)
- Rosho Tsutsujimori:
  - Masamichi Satonaka (2020-2023)
  - Torayoshi Iida (2024-present)
- Rei Amayado:
  - Yoshihisa Higashiyama (2020-2021)
  - Naoya Gōmoto (2022-2023)
  - Taishi Yoshikawa (2024-present)

Nagoya Division Bad Ass Temple

- Kuko Harai:
  - Ryota Hirono (2020-2023)
  - Tomoya Nakanishi (2024-present)
- Jyushi Aimono:
  - Daigo Kato (2020-2023)
  - Fūta Sakayori (2024-present)
- Hitoya Amaguni:
  - Ruito Aoyagi (2020-2023)
  - Kōhei Nakatsuka (2024-present)

Chuoku Division Kotonoha To

- Tohoten Otome:
  - Nanaka (2025-present)
- Kadenokoji Ichijiku:
  - Yuri Shiramine (2025-present)
- Aohitsugi Nemu:
  - Momoko Takahashi (2025-present)

Others

- Kannabi Yotsutsuji:
  - Yojiro Itokawa (2022)
- Keitoin Honobono:
  - Yuri Ota (2025-present)

=== Original Cast ===
In addition to the existing characters from the main Hypnosis Mic franchise, Rule the Stage has introduced numerous characters that are unique to the stage productions.

Akabane Division North Bastard

- Doan Kazusato
  - Yuta Kishimoto (2019-present)
- Kokuri Ryozan
  - Kaito Nambu (2019-present)
- Saragi Kenei
  - Tsukasa Matsuura (2019-present)

Asakusa Division Onigawara Bombers

- Jinpachi Ho-zuki
  - Ryosuke Kato (2020-present)
- Masamune Komagata
  - Taisuke Wada (2020-present)
- Doshiro Yogo
  - Kazuya Yuki (2020-present)

Dotonbori Divers

- Haru Takanashi
  - Yuta Hoshino (2020-present)
- Hirotaka Watamoto
  - Satsuki Kitano (2020-present)
- Ryotaro Akanegakubo
  - Yuri Takahashi (2020-present)

Kyoto Division Itonokai

- Danjyo Oogumo
  - Makoto Uenobori (2020-present)

Desperado-004 (D4)

- Ibuki Yagasaki
  - Shunichi Takahashi (2022-present)
- Seigen Arima
  - Yuu Fukuzawa (2022-present)
- Rindo Akune
  - Kaito Okano (2022-present)
- Jyobu Jikuin
  - Dai Goto (2022-present)

Tsukinone

- Itsuka Amatsumi
  - Yuuka Tano (2024-present)
- Inori Amatsumi
  - Seri Suzumura (2024-present)

Hachioji Division WESTEND-MAFIA

- Mahiru Shirakumo
  - SHIN (2024-present)
- Ranmaru Igari
  - Sasaki Teshima (2024-present)
- Yoshitsune Sakiyama
  - Hitoshi Okumura (2024-present)
- Tokuma Kirimura
  - Jun (2024-present)
- Shion Hisakaze
  - Ranju Aoi (2024-present)

Others

- Hiyori/Haizaki Mato
  - Sekai (2025-present)
- Suguri Oogimachi
  - Yu Yoshioka (2025)
- Oboro Shinonome
  - Nanaka Suzuki (2025-present)
- Sonoka Sanjoin
  - Yuriya Suzuki (2025-present)

=== Division Dance Battle ===
The main cast is supported by a group of several background dancers under the name Division Dance Battle (D.D.B.). They also assist in choreography direction and serve as extras in the productions. D.D.B. also participated in motion capture animation for the Hypnosis Mic: Division Rap Battle Movie.

D.D.B. Members

- RYO
- Toyotaka
- gash!
- SHINSUKE
- HILOMU
- Dolton
- KENTA
- GeN
- YASU
- kaito
- SOUTA
- HIROMA
- Kimutaku

==== Performance Schedule (Stage) ====
Performance Title	Schedule	Venue	Characters
『Hypnosis Mic -Division Rap Battle-』Rule the Stage -track.1-	November 15 - December 1, 2019	Shinagawa Stellar Ball	Buster Bros!!! MAD TRIGGER CREW; North Bastard
『Hypnosis Mic -Division Rap Battle-』Rule the Stage -track.2-	August 12–19, 2020	Shinagawa Stellar Ball	Fling Posse; Matenro; Onigawara Bombers
『Hypnosis Mic -Division Rap Battle-』Rule the Stage -track.3-	October 2–11, 2020	TOKYO DOME CITY HALL	Dotsuitare Hompo; Bad Ass Temple; Itonokai; Doutonbori Divers
『Hypnosis Mic -Division Rap Battle-』Rule the Stage -track.4-	Tokyo: February 5–19, 2021; Osaka: February 25–28; Fukuoka: March 5–7	TOKYO DOME CITY HALL; Mielparque Hall Osaka; Fukuoka Sunpalace Hotel & Hall	Buster Bros!!! MAD TRIGGER CREW; Fling Posse; Matenro
『Hypnosis Mic -Division Rap Battle-』Rule the Stage -Flava Edition-	June 11–13 ・ 18 - 20, 2021	Mixalive TOKYO Club Mixa	North Bastard; Onigawara Bombers
『Hypnosis Mic -Division Rap Battle-』Rule the Stage -Battle of Pride-	Osaka: August 14–15, 2021; Kanagawa: August 24–25	Maruzen Intec Arena Osaka; PIA ARENA MM	All Characters
『Hypnosis Mic -Division Rap Battle-』Rule the Stage -track.5-	Osaka: January 7–9, 2022; Tokyo: January 27 - February 6	Mielparque Hall Osaka; TOKYO DOME CITY HALL	The Dirty Dawg; D4
『Hypnosis Mic -Division Rap Battle-』Rule the Stage -Mix Tape1-	July 14–18, 2022	TOKYO DOME CITY HALL	MAD TRIGGER CREW; Fling Posse; North Bastard
『Hypnosis Mic -Division Rap Battle-』Rule the Stage《Rep LIVE side M.T.C》	July - August 2022	KT Zepp Yokohama; Zepp Fukuoka; Zepp Osaka Bayside	MAD TRIGGER CREW
『Hypnosis Mic -Division Rap Battle-』Rule the Stage《Rep LIVE side F.P》	July - August 2022	Zepp Sapporo; Zepp Haneda; Zepp Nagoya	Fling Posse
『Hypnosis Mic -Division Rap Battle-』Rule the Stage《Dotsuitare Hompo VS Buster Bros!!!》	September - October 2022	TOKYO DOME CITY HALL; COOL JAPAN PARK OSAKA WWホール	Dotsuitare Hompo; Buster Bros!!!
『Hypnosis Mic -Division Rap Battle-』Rule the Stage《Bad Ass Temple VS Matenro》	December 1–18, 2022	Shinagawa Stellar Ball	Bad Ass Temple; Matenro
『Hypnosis Mic -Division Rap Battle-』Rule the Stage《Fling Posse VS MAD TRIGGER CREW》	March 2023	COOL JAPAN PARK OSAKA WWホール; TOKYO DOME CITY HALL	Fling Posse; MAD TRIGGER CREW
『Hypnosis Mic -Division Rap Battle-』Rule the Stage《Rep LIVE side M》	May 2023	KT Zepp Yokohama; Zepp Sapporo; Zepp Shinjuku	Matenro
『Hypnosis Mic -Division Rap Battle-』Rule the Stage《Rep LIVE side B.A.T》	May - June, 2023	Zepp Nagoya; Zepp Osaka Bayside; Zepp Haneda	Bad Ass Temple
『Hypnosis Mic -Division Rap Battle-』Rule the Stage《Rep LIVE side D.H》	May - July, 2023	Zepp Fukuoka; Zepp Osaka Bayside; KT Zepp Yokohama	Dotsuitare Hompo
『Hypnosis Mic -Division Rap Battle-』Rule the Stage《Rep LIVE side B.B》	June - July, 2023	Zepp Nanba; Zepp Fukuoka; Zepp Haneda	Buster Bros!!!
『Hypnosis Mic -Division Rap Battle-』Rule the Stage《Rep LIVE side Rule the Stage Original》	August 9–13, 2023	Shinagawa Stellar Ball	North Bastard; Onigawara Bombers; Itonokai; Doutonbori Divers; D4
『Hypnosis Mic -Division Rap Battle-』Rule the Stage -Battle of Pride 2023-	Osaka: September 3, 2024; Kanagawa: September 7–10	Osaka-jō Hall; PIA AREMA MM	All Characters
『Hypnosis Mic -Division Rap Battle-』Rule the Stage -New Encounter-	Tokyo: March 1–17, 2024; Osaka: April 4–7	Shinagawa Stellar Ball; COOL JAPAN PARK OSAKA WWホール	Buster Bros!!! MAD TRIGGER CREW; Fling Posse; Matenro; Dotsuitare Hompo; Bad Ass Temple
『Hypnosis Mic -Division Rap Battle-』 Rule the Stage -Renegade of Female-	Tokyo: July 4-15, 2024 Osaka: July 25-28, 2024	Shinagawa Prince Hotel Club eX Matsushita IMP Hall	Kotonoha To
『Hypnosis Mic -Division Rap Battle-』 Rule the Stage -Grateful Cypher-	Tokyo: October 4-14, 2024	Tokyo Dome City Hall	Buster Bros!!! MAD TRIGGER CREW; Fling Posse; Matenro; Dotsuitare Hompo; Bad Ass Temple Westend Mafia
『Hypnosis Mic -Division Rap Battle-』 Rule the Stage 《MAD TRIGGER CREW & Dotsuitare Hompo feat. Dotonbori Divers》	Osaka: April 18-20, 2025 Tokyo: May 1-11, 2025	Cool Japan Park Osaka WW Hall Shinagawa Prince Hotel Stellar Ball	MAD TRIGGER CREW Dotsuitare Hompo Dotonbori Divers
『Hypnosis Mic -Division Rap Battle-』 Rule the Stage 《Mix Tape1 Revenge》	Tokyo: July 11-27, 2025	Shinagawa Prince Hotel Stellar Ball	MAD TRIGGER CREW Fling Posse North Bastard
『Hypnosis Mic -Division Rap Battle-』 Rule the Stage -Ideal and Reality-	Tokyo: September 4-23, 2025	Shinagawa Prince Hotel Club eX	Kotonoha To
『Hypnosis Mic -Division Rap Battle-』 Rule the Stage 《Buster Bros!!! & Bad Ass Temple feat. Itonokai & WESTEND-MAFIA》	Tokyo: October 17-24, 2025	Kanadevia Hall	Buster Bros!!! Bad Ass Temple Itonokai Westend Mafia
『Hypnosis Mic -Division Rap Battle-』 Rule the Stage 《Hypnosis Delight Fes.》	Tokyo: October 25-26, 2025	Kanadevia Hall	All Characters
『Hypnosis Mic -Division Rap Battle-』 Rule the Stage 《Division Jam Tour vol.1》	Yokohama: November 20-21, 2025 Osaka: November 27-28, 2025 Sapporo: December 5, 2025	KT Zepp Yokohama Zepp Namba Zepp Sapporo	MAD TRIGGER CREW Fling Posse Westend Mafia
『Hypnosis Mic -Division Rap Battle-』 Rule the Stage 《Division Jam Tour vol.2》	Fukuoka: January 9, 2026 Nagoya: January 15-16, 2026 Tokyo: January 21-23, 2026	Zepp Fukuoka Zepp Nagoya Zepp DiverCity	Matenro Bad Ass Temple Dotonbori Divers Itonokai
『Hypnosis Mic -Division Rap Battle-』 Rule the Stage 《Fling Posse & Matenro feat. Onigawara Bombers & D4》	Tokyo: March 27-April 19, 2026	THEATER MILANO-Za	Fling Posse Matenro Onigawara Bombers D4
『Hypnosis Mic -Division Rap Battle-』 Rule the Stage -中王区 the LIVE-	Yokohama: May 8-9, 2026 Nagoya: May 14-15, 2026 Fukuoka: May 22-23, 2026	KT Zepp Yokohama Zepp Nagoya Zepp Fukuoka	Kotonoha To

=== Anime ===
An anime television series adaptation titled Hypnosis Mic: Division Rap Battle: Rhyme Anima was announced on December 4, 2019. It aired from October 3 to December 26, 2020.

Season two, Hypnosis Mic: Division Rap Battle: Rhyme Anima+ aired from October 7 to December 30, 2023.

An interactive film animated by Polygon Pictures was released in February 2025. Viewers could vote for their favorite team using the CtrlMovie App, with the votes affecting the outcome of the in-universe rap contest (Division Rap Battle) in the movie. The movie was split into three parts: round one, with Buster Bros!!! battling Bad Ass Temple, MAD TRIGGER CREW battling Dotsuitare Hompo, and Matenro battling Fling Posse in three separate battles. The winners of the first round's battles would then go through another round of voting, leaving one final team facing off against all-female CHU-OH division led by the in-universe prime minister, Otome Tohoten.

Additionally a site went up where viewers could see the results of voting from every cinema showing the movie.

A few screenings of the movie were held at Anime Expo 2025 for English-speaking fans. GKIDS would later partner with Regal Cinemas to distribute the film in North America, giving it a limited theatrical release on February 27, 2026.

=== Radio ===
==== HYPNOSISRADIO supported by Spotify ====
Broadcast on TOKYO FM from October to March 2019.
Three times a month, each of the B.B, MTC, Fling Posse, Matenro, Dotsuitare Hompo, and Bad Ass Temple divisions took turns to serve as radio hosts. Hypnosis Mic music artists were often also guests on the show. The navigator of the program was Daichi Yajima.

==== Spotify HYPNOSIS WAVE ====
Broadcast on J-WAVE from February to September 2021.
The Ikebukuro, Yokohama, Shibuya, Shinjuku, Osaka, and Nagoya divisions change every month, and one person is in charge of the program on a weekly basis. The navigator is Sascha.

== Reception ==
"Hypnosis Mic: Final Battle" was one of the trending topics on Twitter in Japan during the month of November 2018. In 2018, Hypnosis Mic was the most-followed Twitter account in Japan for voice actors in terms of fan engagement.

Fling Posse VS Matenro ranked #1 in the Oricon Weekly Digital Albums Chart. Mad Trigger Crew VS Matenro also ranked #1 on the Oricon Weekly Digital Albums Chart during its first week of release, with approximately 8,000 downloads.

Matenro's album, The Champion, ranked #1 in digital album sales on Oricon on its first week of release, with approximately 9,000 downloads.

The January 2019 issue of Shonen Magazine Edge, where Hypnosis Mic: Division Rap Battle: Before the Battle: The Dirty Dawg debuted, unexpectedly sold out upon manga release.

== Awards and nominations ==
Year	Award	Category	Work/Recipient	Result	Ref(s)
2019	13th Seiyu Awards	Singing Award	Hypnosis Mic franchise	Won	
