= List of aquaria in Japan =

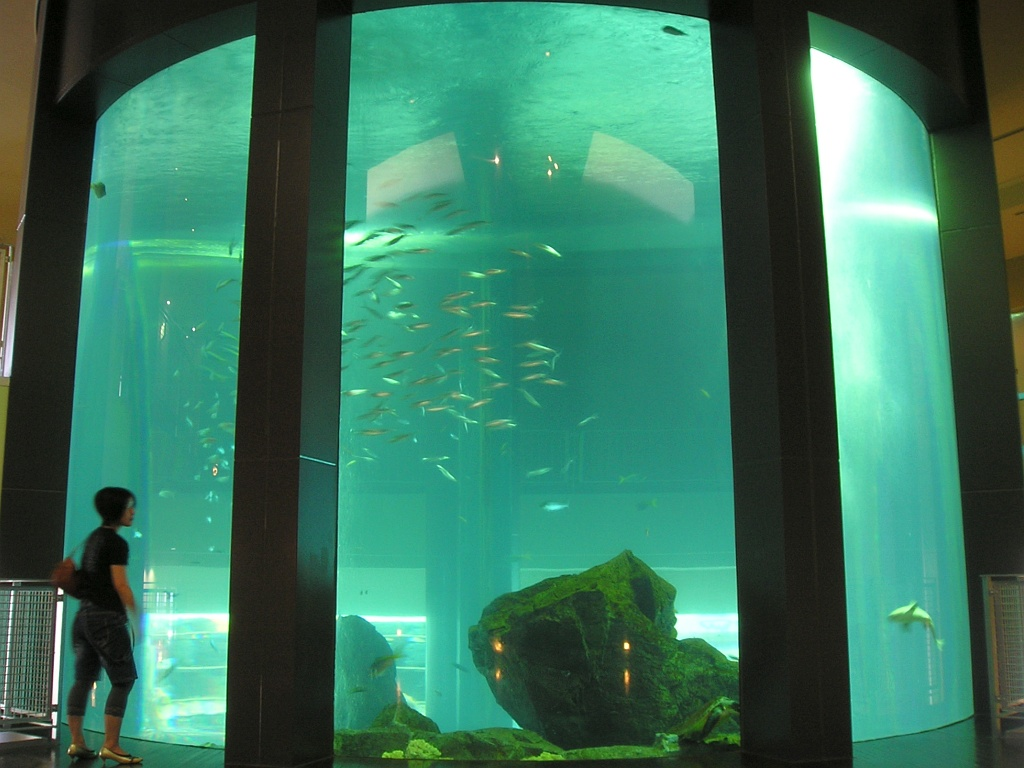
A large tank in the which is open to the public free of charge at Bay side place Hakata

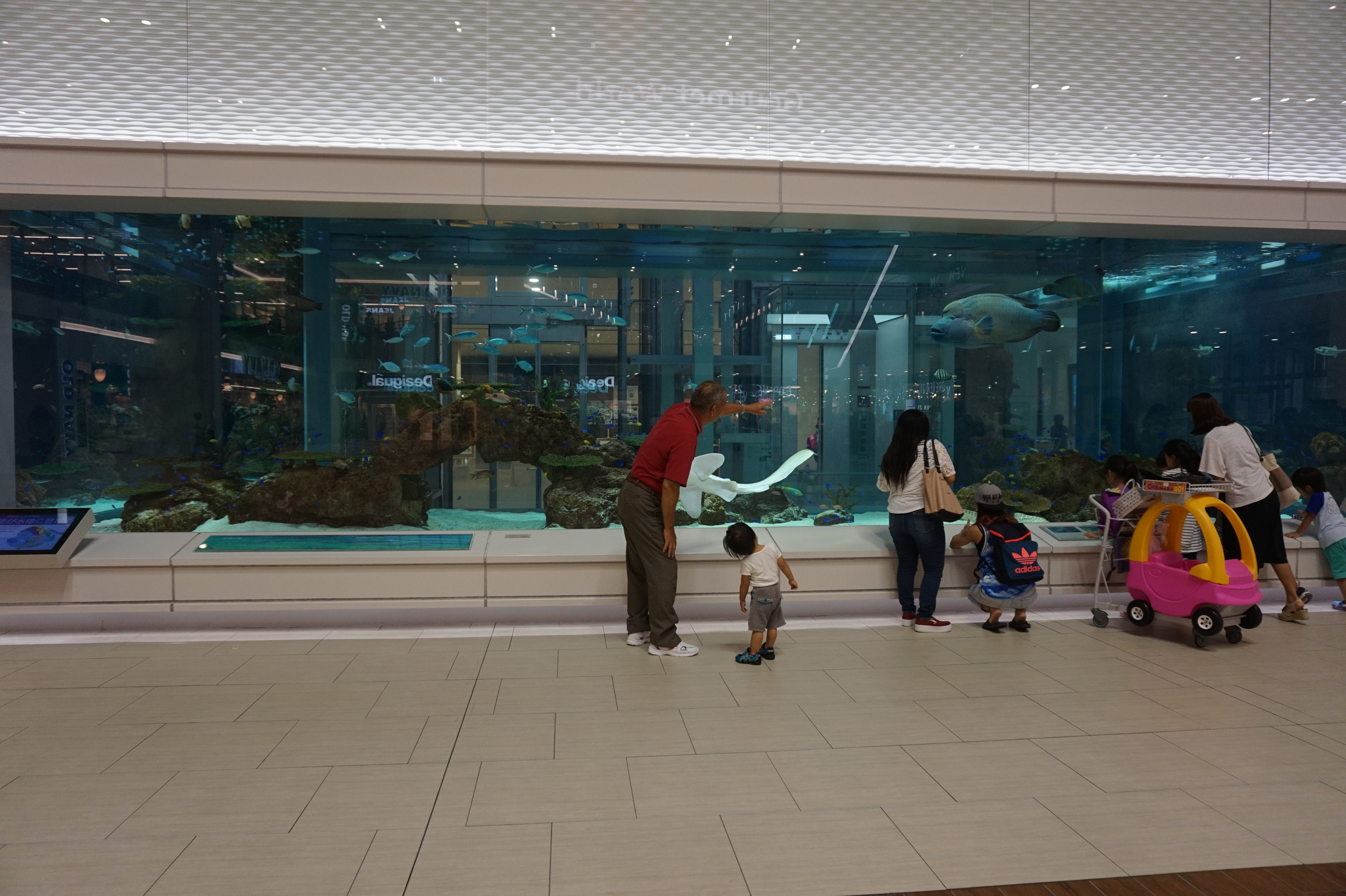
Aeon Mall Rycom Aquarium in Okinawa

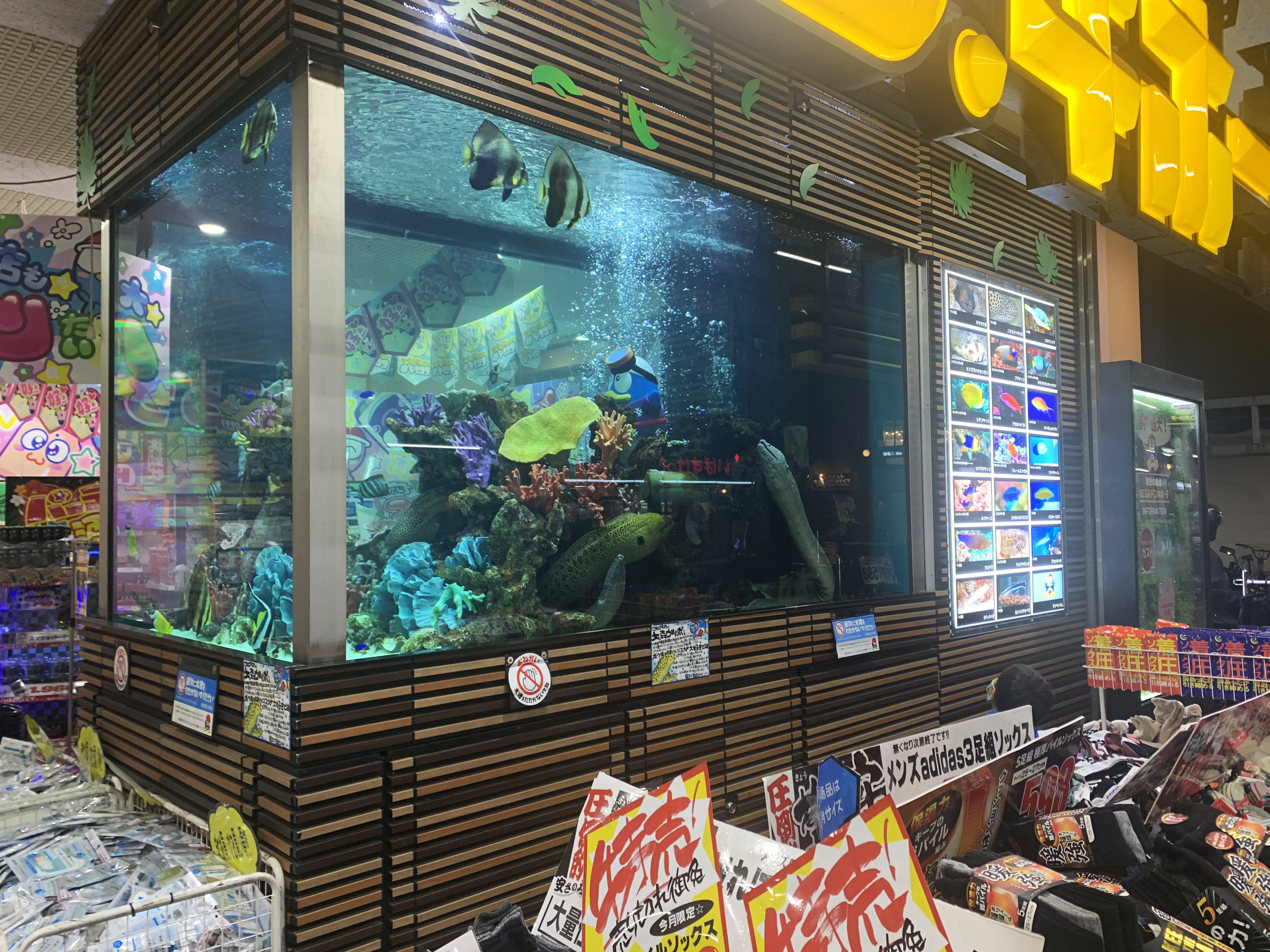
Don Quijote has installed large aquariums in more than 10 stores throughout Japan.

This is a list of aquaria (public aquariums) in Japan. For zoos, see list of zoos in Japan. Also, For worlds, see List of aquaria.

Aquariums are facilities where animals are confined within tanks and displayed to the public, and in which they may also be bred. Such facilities include public aquariums, oceanariums, marine mammal parks, and dolphinariums.

Japan has the largest number of public aquariums per capita in the world. There are many small public aquariums in Japan and many are not on this list.

Some aquariums that are considered to be of high academic value are, have been designated as registered museums or museum-equivalent designated facilities by the Ministry of Education, Culture, Sports, Science and Technology.

In addition, large fish tanks are often installed at large commercial facilities, stations, and airport, Large commercial facilities such as Aeon mall, Lalaport, Don Quijote etc., all of which are open to the public for free.

== Aichi Prefecture ==
- Hekinan Seaside Aquarium, Hekinan, Aichi
- Minamichita Beachland Aquarium, Mihama, Aichi
- Port of Nagoya Public Aquarium, Nagoya, Aichi
- Sea Life Nagoya, Nagoya, Aichi
- Takeshima Aquarium, Gamagōri, Aichi

== Akita Prefecture ==
- Oga Aquarium Gao, Oga, Akita

== Aomori Prefecture ==
- Asamushi Aquarium, Aomori, Aomori
- Marient Hachinohe City Fisheries Science Museum, Hachinohe, Aomori

== Chiba Prefecture ==
- Sekaiichi chitchana Aquarium, Choshi, Chiba
- Inubōsaki Marine Park, Choshi, Chiba (closed)
- Kamogawa Sea World, Kamogawa, Chiba

== Ehime Prefecture ==
- Nijino mori Park Aquarium Osakanakan (The Aquarium of Shimantogawa River), Matsuno, Ehime
- Nagako Aquarium (in Nagahama high School), Nagahama, Ehime

== Fukui Prefecture ==
- Echizen Matsushima Aquarium, Sakai, Fukui

== Fukuoka Prefecture ==
- Marine World Uminonakamichi, Fukuoka, Fukuoka

== Fukushima Prefecture ==
- Aquamarine Fukushima, Iwaki, Fukushima
- Inawashiro Kingfisher Aquarium, Inawashiro, Fukushima

== Gifu Prefecture ==
- World Freshwater Aquarium, Kakamigahara, Gifu
- Forest Aquarium, Takayama, Gifu

== Gunma Prefecture ==
- Minakami Water Travel Road Station, Fisheries Learning Center, Minakami, Gunma

== Hiroshima Prefecture ==
- Miyajima Public Aquarium (Marine Plaza Miyajima), Hatsukaichi, Hiroshima
- Fukuyama University Marine Biocenter Aquarium, Onomichi, Hiroshima
- Mariho Aquarium, Hiroshima, Hiroshima
- Aqua Alive museum (Hiroshima Motomachi Aquarium),Hiroshima, Hiroshima

== Hokkaidō ==
- Otaru Aquarium, Otaru, Hokkaidō
- Wakkanai Noshappu Cold Aquarium, Wakkanai, Hokkaido
- Sun Piaza Aquarium, Sapporo, Hokkaido
- AOAO SAPPORO, Sapporo, Hokkaido
- Sapporo Salmon Museum, Sapporo, Hokkaido
- Shibetsu Salmon Science Museum, Shibetsu, Hokkaido
- Noboribetsu Marine Park Nixe, Noboribetsu, Hokkaido
- kushiro Aquarium Pukupuku, kushiro, Hokkaido
- Chitose Aquarium, Chitose, Hokkaido
- Yama no Aquarium, kitami, Hokkaido
- Muroran Aquarium, Muroran, Hokkaido
- Okhotsk Aquarium, Abashiri, Hokkaido(closed)

== Hyōgo Prefecture ==
- Atoa, Kobe, Hyōgo
- Aqua tojo, Katō, Hyōgo
- Minatoyama Aquarium, Kobe, Hyōgo
- Kobe Suma Sea World, Kobe, Hyōgo
- Kinosaki Marine World, Toyooka, Hyōgo
- Himeji Aquarium, Himeji, Hyōgo
- Kobe School Aquarium AQUA TEXT, kobe, Hyōgo

== Ibaraki Prefecture ==
- Aqua World, Oarai, Ibaraki
- Kasumigaura Aquarium, Kasumigaura, Ibaraki
- Yamagata freshwater park, Yamagata, Ibaraki(closed)

== Iwate Prefecture ==
- Kuji Underground Aquarium and Science Museum Moguranpia, Kuji, Iwate

== Ishikawa Prefecture ==
- Notojima Aquarium, Notojima, Ishikawa

== Kagawa Prefecture ==
- Shikoku Aquarium, Utazu
- New Yashima Aquarium, takamatsu

== Kagoshima Prefecture ==
- Kagoshima Aquarium, Kagoshima
- Amami Ocean Exhibition Hall, Amami Ōshima

== Kanagawa Prefecture ==
- Aburatsubo Marine Park Aquarium, Miura, Kanagawa (closed)
- Aquarium Sagamihara, Sagamihara, Kanagawa
- Hakone-en Aquarium, Hakonemachi, Kanagawa
- kawasaki Aquarium, kawasaki, Kanagawa
- Kitazato Aquarium Lab, Sagamihara, Kanagawa
- Enoshima Aquarium, Fujisawa, Kanagawa
- Yokohama Hakkeijima Sea Paradise, Yokohama, Kanagawa
- Makado Sea Marine Park (in Makado Elementary School), Yokohama, Kanagawa
- Yomiuri Land Seal Pavilion, Kawasaki, Kanagawa
- Yokohama Fortune Aquarium , Yokohama, Kanagawa

== Kōchi Prefecture ==
- Muroto Schoolhouse Aquarium, Muroto, Kōchi
- Katsurahama Aquarium, Kōchi, Kōchi
- Ashizuri Ocean Aquarium, Tosashimizu, Kōchi
- Shimanto River Museum Akitsuio, Shimanto, Kōchi

== Kyoto Prefecture ==
- Kyoto Aquarium, Kyoto
- Hanazono Church Aquarium, Kyoto
- Uocchikan, Miyazu, Kyoto (closed)

== Kumamoto Prefecture ==
- Amakusa Aquarium, Dolphin World, Hondo, Kumamoto
- Sea Donut Aquarium, Kamiamakusa, Kumamoto

== Mie Prefecture ==
- Futami Seaparadise, Ise, Mie
- Shima Marineland, Shima, Mie(closed)
- Toba Aquarium, Toba, Mie
- AKAME WATERFALLs AQUARIUM, Nabari, Mie

== Miyagi Prefecture ==
- The Ice Aquarium, Kesennuma, Miyagi
- Sendai Umino-Mori Aquarium, Sendai
- Aqua Terrace Nishikigaoka, Sendai

== Miyazaki Prefecture ==
- Oyodo River Study Aquarium, Miyazaki, Miyazaki
- Dolphin Land, Kushima, Miyazaki
- Idenoyama Fresh Water Aquarium, Kobayashi, Miyazaki

== Nagano Prefecture ==
- Alps Azumino National Government Park (Azumino school aquarium), Azumino, Nagano
- Tateshina Amusement Aquarium, Chino, Nagano

== Nagasaki Prefecture ==
- Nagasaki Penguin Aquarium, Nagasaki
- Umi Kirara Saikai National Park Aquarium, Sasebo, Nagasaki
- Mutsugorou Aquarium, Isahaya, Nagasaki

== Niigata Prefecture ==
- Joetsu Aquarium Umigatari, Joetsu, Niigata
- Niigata City Aquarium Marinpia Nihonkai, Niigata, Niigata
- Teradomari Aquarium, Teradomari, Niigata
- iyoboya museum, Murakami, Niigata

== Nara Prefecture ==
- Nara kingyo musiam, Nara city, Nara

== Ōita Prefecture ==
- Oita Marine Palace Aquarium Umitamago, Ōita, Ōita
- Bansho osakana kan, Saiki, Ōita

== Okayama Prefecture ==
- Tamano Marine Museum, Tamano, Okayama

== Okinawa Prefecture ==
- Okinawa Churaumi Aquarium, Okinawa
- DMM kariyushi Aquarium, Okinawa

== Osaka Prefecture ==
- Osaka Aquarium Kaiyukan, Osaka
- NIFREL, Osaka
- Osaka Water Museum and Aquarium, Osaka

== Saitama Prefecture ==
- Saitama Aquarium, Hanyu, Saitama

== Shiga Prefecture ==
- Lake Biwa Museum, Kusatsu, Shiga
- Miyazu Energy Laboratory Aquarium, Kyoto, Shiga

== Shimane Prefecture ==
- Shimane Aquarium AQUAS, Hamada, Shimane
- Shinjiko Nature Museum, GOBIUS, Hirata, Shimane

== Shizuoka Prefecture ==
- Izu Andyland, Kawazu, Shizuoka
- Izu Mito Sea Paradise, Numazu, Shizuoka
- Yogyo Aquarium, Suntō, Shizuoka
- Wotto Hamanako Aquatic Experience Center, Hamamatsu, Shizuoka
- Numazu Deep Sea Aquarium, Numazu, Shizuoka
- Marine Science Museum, Tokai University, Shizuoka, Shizuoka
- Shimoda Floating Aquarium, Shimoda, Shizuoka
- SMART AQUARiUM SHIZUOKA, Shizuoka City, Shizuoka

== Tochigi Prefecture ==
- Nakagawa Aquatic Park, Tochigi, Tochigi

== Tokushima Prefecture ==
- Sea Nature Museum Marine Jam, Kaiyō, Tokushima

== Tokyo ==
- Aqua Park Shinagawa, Minato, Tokyo
- Art Aquarium Museum, Ginza, Tokyo
- Ogasawara marine centre, Ogasawara, Tokyo
- Sunshine Aquarium, Toshima, Tokyo
- Tokyo Sea Life Park, Edogawa, Tokyo
- Shinagawa Aquarium, Shinagawa, Tokyo
- Sumida Aquarium, Sumida, Tokyo
- Adachi Park of Living Things, Adachi, Tokyo
- Itabashi Botanical aquarium(at Itabashi Botanical Garden), Itabashi, Tokyo

== Toyama Prefecture ==
- Uozu Aquarium, Uozu, Toyama

== Wakayama Prefecture ==
- Adventure World, Shirahama, Wakayama
- Shirahama Aquarium, Shirahama, Wakayama
- Taiji Whale Museum, Taiji, Wakayama
- Kushimoto Marine Park Center, Kushimoto, Wakayama
- Wakayama Pref. Museum of Natural History, Kainan, Wakayama
- Wakayama Prefectural Museum of Natural History, Kainan, Wakayama
- Susami Crustacean Aquarium, Susami, Wakayama

== Yamagata Prefecture ==
- Kamo Aquarium, Tsuruoka, Yamagata

== Yamaguchi Prefecture ==
- Shimonoseki Municipal Aquarium Kaikyokan, Shimonoseki, Yamaguchi
- Nagisa aquarium, Suō-Ōshima, Yamaguchi

== Yamanashi Prefecture ==
- Fuji Yusui no Sato Aquarium, Oshino, Yamanashi

== See also ==
- List of botanical gardens
- List of dolphinariums
- List of tourist attractions worldwide
- Marine mammal park
