= List of zoos in Japan =

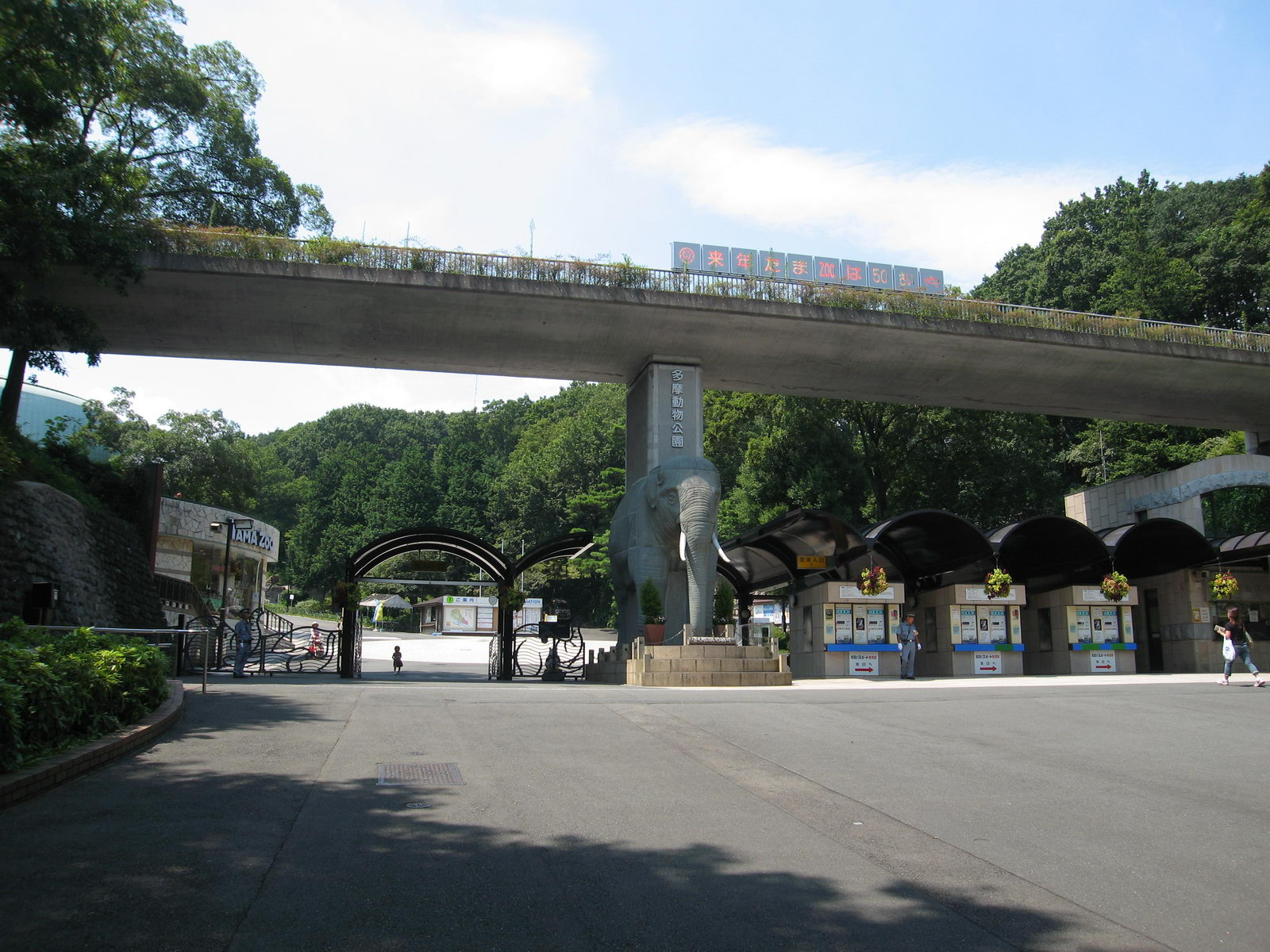
Tama Zoological Park Hino-Tokyo-Japan

This is a partial list of zoos in Japan. For aquaria, see List of aquaria in Japan.

Such facilities include zoos, safari parks, animal theme parks, aviaries, butterfly zoos, and reptile centers, as well as wildlife sanctuaries and nature reserves where visitors are allowed.

== Aichi Prefecture ==
- Higashiyama Zoo and Botanical Gardens, Nagoya
- Japan Monkey Centre, Inuyama, Aichi
- Okazaki Higashi Park Zoo, Okazaki, Aichi
- Toyohashi Zoo & Botanical Park, Toyohashi, Aichi
- Toyota City Kuragaike-Park, Toyota, Aichi

== Akita Prefecture ==
- Akita Omoriyama Zoo, Akita, Akita

== Chiba Prefecture ==
- Chiba Zoological Park, Chiba, Chiba
- Ichihara Elephant Kingdom, Ichihara, Chiba
- Ichikawa Zoological & Botanical Garden, Ichikawa, Chiba
- Mother Farm, Futtsu, Chiba

== Ehime Prefecture ==
- Tobe Zool. Park of Ehime Prefecture, Iyo, Ehime

== Fukui Prefecture ==
- Sabae Nishiyama Park Zoo, Sabae, Fukui

== Fukuoka Prefecture ==
- Assuran Bird House, Onojo
- Fukuoka Municipal Zoo and Botanical Garden, Fukuoka
- Itozu no Mori Zoological Park, Kitakyūshū
- Kurume City Bird Center, Kurume, Fukuoka
- Ōmuta Zoo, Ōmuta, Fukuoka
- Uminonakamichi Seaside Park Zoological Garden, Fukuoka

== Fukushima Prefecture ==
- Tohoku Safari Park, Nihonmatsu, Fukushima

== Gunma Prefecture ==
- Gunma Safari Park, Tomioka, Gunma
- Kiryugaoka Zoo, Kiryu, Gunma

== Hiroshima Prefecture ==
- Fukuyama City Zoo, Fukuyama, Hiroshima
- Hiroshima City Asa Zoological Park, Hiroshima

== Hokkaidō ==
- Asahiyama Zoo, Asahikawa, Hokkaidō
- Kushiro Zoo, Kushiro, Hokkaidō
- Noboribetsu Bear Park, Noboribetsu, Hokkaidō
- Obihiro Zoo, Obihiro, Hokkaido
- Sapporo Maruyama Zoo, Sapporo

== Hyogo Prefecture ==
- Awaji Farm Park England Hill, Minamiawaji, Hyōgo
- Himeji Central Park, Himeji, Hyōgo
- Himeji City Zoo, Himeji, Hyōgo
- Kobe Animal Kingdom, Kobe
- Oji Zoo, Kobe

== Ibaraki Prefecture ==
- Hitachi Kamine Zoological Garden, Hitachi, Ibaraki

== Ishikawa Prefecture ==
- Ishikawa Zoo, Nomi, Ishikawa

== Iwate Prefecture ==
- Morioka Zoological Park, Morioka, Iwate
- Iwate Safari Park, Ichinoseki, Iwate

== Kagawa Prefecture ==
- Shirotori Zoo, Higashi Kagawa, Kagawa

== Kagoshima Prefecture ==
- Hirakawa Zoological Park, Kagoshima

== Kanagawa Prefecture ==
- Kanazawa Zoological Gardens, Yokohama
- Nogeyama Zoo, Yokohama
- Yokohama Zoo (Zoorasia), Yokohama
- Yumemigasaki Zoological Park, Kawasaki, Kanagawa

== Kōchi Prefecture ==
- Noichi Zoological Park of Kōchi Prefecture, Komi District, Kōchi
- Wanpark Kōchi Animal Land, Kōchi, Kōchi

== Kumamoto Prefecture ==
- Cuddly Dominion, Aso, Kumamoto
- Kumamoto City Zoological and Botanical Gardens, Kumamoto, Kumamoto

== Kyoto Prefecture ==
- Kyoto Municipal Zoo, Kyoto
- Fukuchiyama Zoo, Fukuchiyama,Kyoto

== Mie Prefecture ==
- Oouchiyama Zoo, Watarai, Mie
- Gokatsuraike Zoo, Taki, Mie

== Miyagi Prefecture ==
- Miyagi Zao Fox Village
- Yagiyama Zoological Park, Sendai

== Miyazaki Prefecture ==
- Miyazaki City Phenix Zoo, Miyazaki, Miyazaki

== Nagano Prefecture ==
- Iida City Zoo, Iida, Nagano
- Nagano Chausuyama Zoo, Nagano, Nagano
- Omachi Alpine Museum, Omachi, Nagano
- Suzaka Zoo, Suzaka, Nagano
- Komoro Zoo, Komoro, Nagano
- Shiroyama Zoo, Nagano, Nagano

== Nagasaki Prefecture ==
- Nagasaki Biopark, Saikai, Nagasaki
- Sasebo Zoological Park and Botanical Garden, Sasebo, Nagasaki

== Ōita Prefecture ==
- Kyushu Natural Animal Park African Safari, Usa, Ōita

== Okayama Prefecture ==
- Ikeda Zoo, Okayama, Okayama
- Shibukawa Zoo

== Okinawa Prefecture ==
- Neo Park Okinawa, Nago, Okinawa
- Okinawa Kodomo Future Zone, Okinawa

== Osaka Prefecture ==
- Kashihara City Insectary Museum, Kashiwara, Osaka
- Satsukiyama Zoo, Ikeda, Osaka
- Tennoji Zoo, Osaka

== Saitama Prefecture ==
- Saitama Children's Zoo, Higashimatsuyama, Saitama
- Saitama Omiya Park Zoo, Saitama, Saitama
- Sayama Chikosan Park Children Zoo, Sayama, Saitama
- Tobu Zoo, Minamisaitama District, Saitama

== Shimane Prefecture ==
- Matsue Vogel Park, Matsue, Shimane

== Shizuoka Prefecture ==
- Atagawa Tropical & Alligator Garden, Kamo District, Shizuoka
- Fuji Safari Park, Susono, Shizuoka
- Hamamatsu Municipal Zoo, Hamamatsu
- iZoo, Kawazu, Shizuoka
- Izu Animal Kingdom, Kamo District, Shizuoka
- Izu Shaboten Zoo, Itō, Shizuoka
- Mishima City Park Rakujuen, Mishima, Shizuoka
- Shizuoka Municipal Nihondaira Zoo, Shizuoka, Shizuoka

== Tochigi Prefecture ==
- Nasu Animal Kingdom, Nasu, Tochigi
- Nasu World Monkey Park, Nasu, Tochigi
- Nasu Safari Park, Nasu, Tochigi
- Utsunomiya Zoo, Utsunomiya, Tochigi

== Tokushima Prefecture ==
- Tokushima Municipal Zoo, Tokushima, Tokushima

== Tokyo ==
- Edogawa Ward Natural Zoo, Edogawa, Tokyo
- Hamura Zoological Park, Hamura, Tokyo
- Inogashira Park Zoo, Tokyo
- Ōshima Park Zoo, Izu Ōshima
- Tama Zoo, Tokyo
- Ueno Zoo, Ueno, Tokyo
- Adachi Park of Living Things , Adachi, Tokyo

== Toyama Prefecture ==
- Takaoka Kojo Park Zoo, Takaoka, Toyama
- Toyama Municipal Family Park Zoo, Toyama, Toyama

== Wakayama Prefecture ==
- Adventure World, Shirahama, Shirahama, Wakayama
- Wakayama Park Zoo, Wakayama, Wakayama

== Yamaguchi Prefecture ==
- Akiyoshidai Safari Land, Mine, Yamaguchi
- Shunan Municipal Tokuyama Zoo, Shūnan, Yamaguchi
- Ube Tokiwa Park, Ube, Yamaguchi

== Yamanashi Prefecture ==
- Kofu Yuki Park Zoo, Kofu, Yamanashi

== See also ==
- List of aquaria in Japan
- List of botanical gardens in Japan
- List of dolphinariums
- List of fossil parks
- List of national parks
- List of tourist attractions worldwide
- List of WAZA member zoos and aquariums
- List of wildlife sanctuaries
- List of zoos
