= Kumamoto City Zoological and Botanical Gardens =

- 熊本市動植物園 (Japanese)
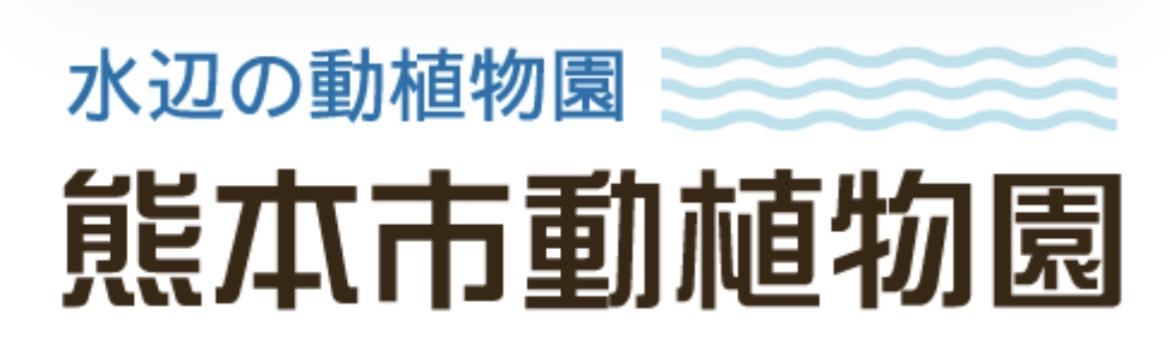
- Logo of Kumamoto Zoo and Botanical Gardens in Japanese

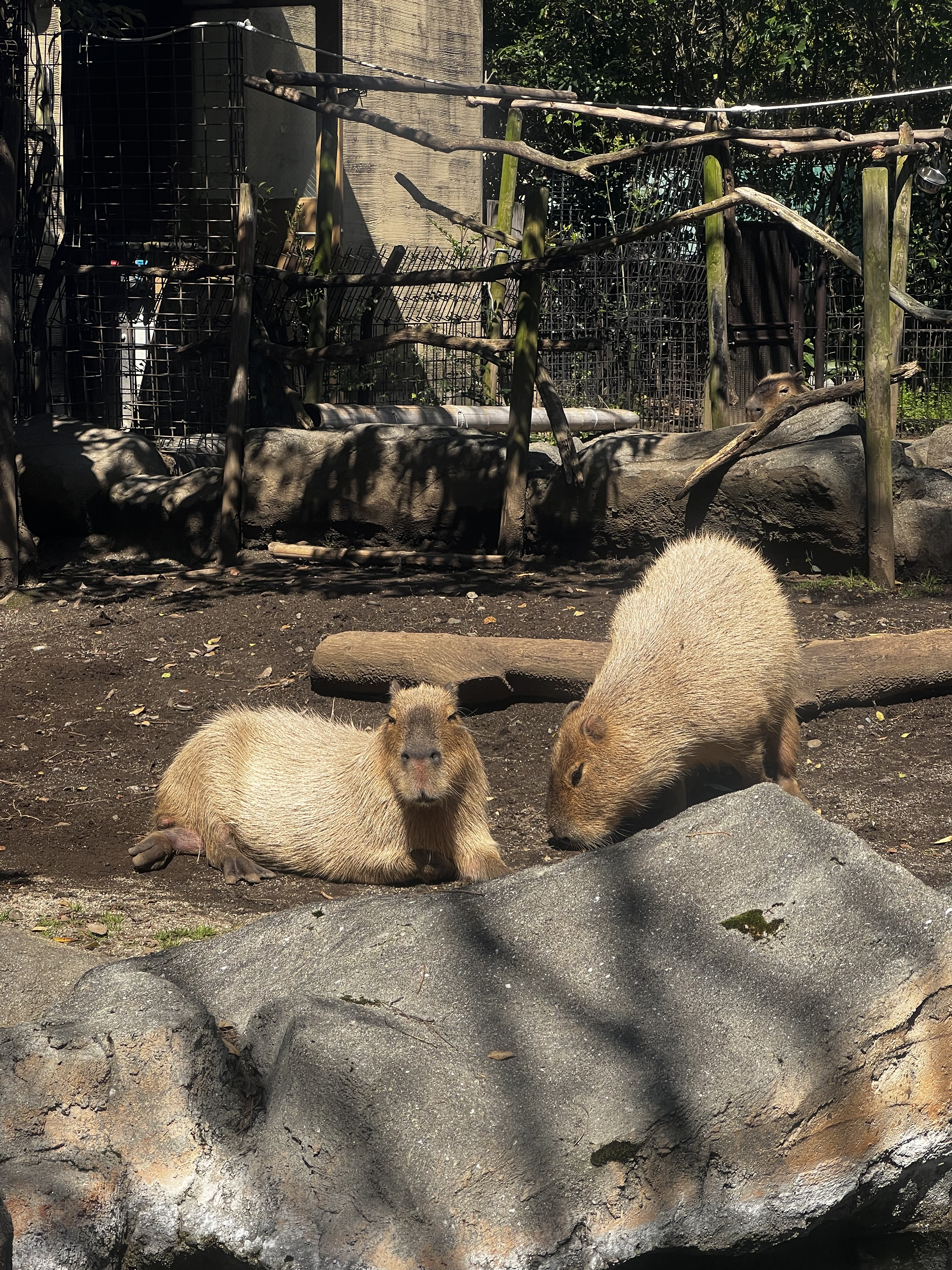
- Capybaras at their exhibit in the park
- Interactive map of Kumamoto City Zoological and Botanical Gardens
- 32°46′29″N 130°44′51″E
- Location: Kumamoto, Japan
- Land area: 24 acres (9.7 ha)
- No. of animals: 550
- No. of species: 110
- Website: http://www.ezooko.jp/, https://www.ezooko.jp/

Kumamoto City Zoological and Botanical Gardens (Japanese: 熊本市動植物園) is a 24 acre (9.7 ha) zoo and botanical garden located in Higasi-ku of Kumamoto, Japan. It was opened in 1969 and houses 550 animals, representing 110 species, and 70,000 plants across 700 species. In 2024, the park received 590,000 visitors; it offers educational programs for elementary and junior secondary schools.

Its precursor, the Kumamoto Zoo (Japanese: 熊本動物園), was opened in 1929 and was situated inside Suizen-ji Park and relocated to its current location in 1969.

The Zoological and Botanical Garden was heavily damaged during the 2016 Kumamoto earthquakes and was forced to close and partially reopened to the public ten months later and only fully reopened two years and eight months later.

== History ==
The Zoological and Botanical Gardens’ predecessor— Kumamoto Zoo (also known as Suizenji Zoo, Japanese: 水前寺動物園) was opened in 1929. Due to aging infrastructure, in 1969, it was moved to its current location. The old park closed on 28 February and the new park was opened to the public on 1 April.

During the 4th National Urban Greening Fair, also known as "Green Pick '86," Kumamoto Zoo served as part of the venue, functioning as the "Animal Plaza." After the conclusion of the Fair, the former plant zone was incorporated into the zoo as a botanical garden, and the park was later renamed from "Kumamoto Zoo" to "Kumamoto City Zoological and Botanical Garden".

During the 2016 Kumamoto earthquakes, the zoo and its exhibits were severely damaged, causing “soil liquefaction and ground fissures,” according to a news report from Nishinippon Shimbun. As a result, one male lion was evacuated to the Kyushu Natural Animal Park African Safari, a female snow leopard named “Spica” to the Omuta City Zoo, a female amur tiger named “Chacha” to Itozu No Mori Zoological Park, and a pair of male and female clouded leopards to the Fukuoka Municipal Zoo and Botanical Garden. As a result of the earthquake , the park closed and partially reopened ten months later, fully opening two years and eight months later.

In 2020, a statue of “Chopper”, a character from the anime “One Piece,” was installed in the park as part of an initiative to help the Kumamoto Prefecture recover from the earthquake.

=== Ellie (Indian Elephant) ===
During the Pacific War, the zoo faced severe food shortages. Thus, the Japanese army ordered the immediate euthanasia of dangerous predators which posed a risk of escaping. One of the animals targeted was an Indian elephant named “エリー” or “Ellie.” Zookeepers pleaded for her life, but to no avail; she was ultimately electrocuted. The story was later memorialized in the choral suite “Sorry, Mary” and the book “I’m Sorry, Mary.” (Note: It was believed her name was “Mary” until after the publication of “I’m Sorry Mary” Archived news article) A video of Ellie still alive at the zoo surfaced in 2025.

== Animals and plants ==
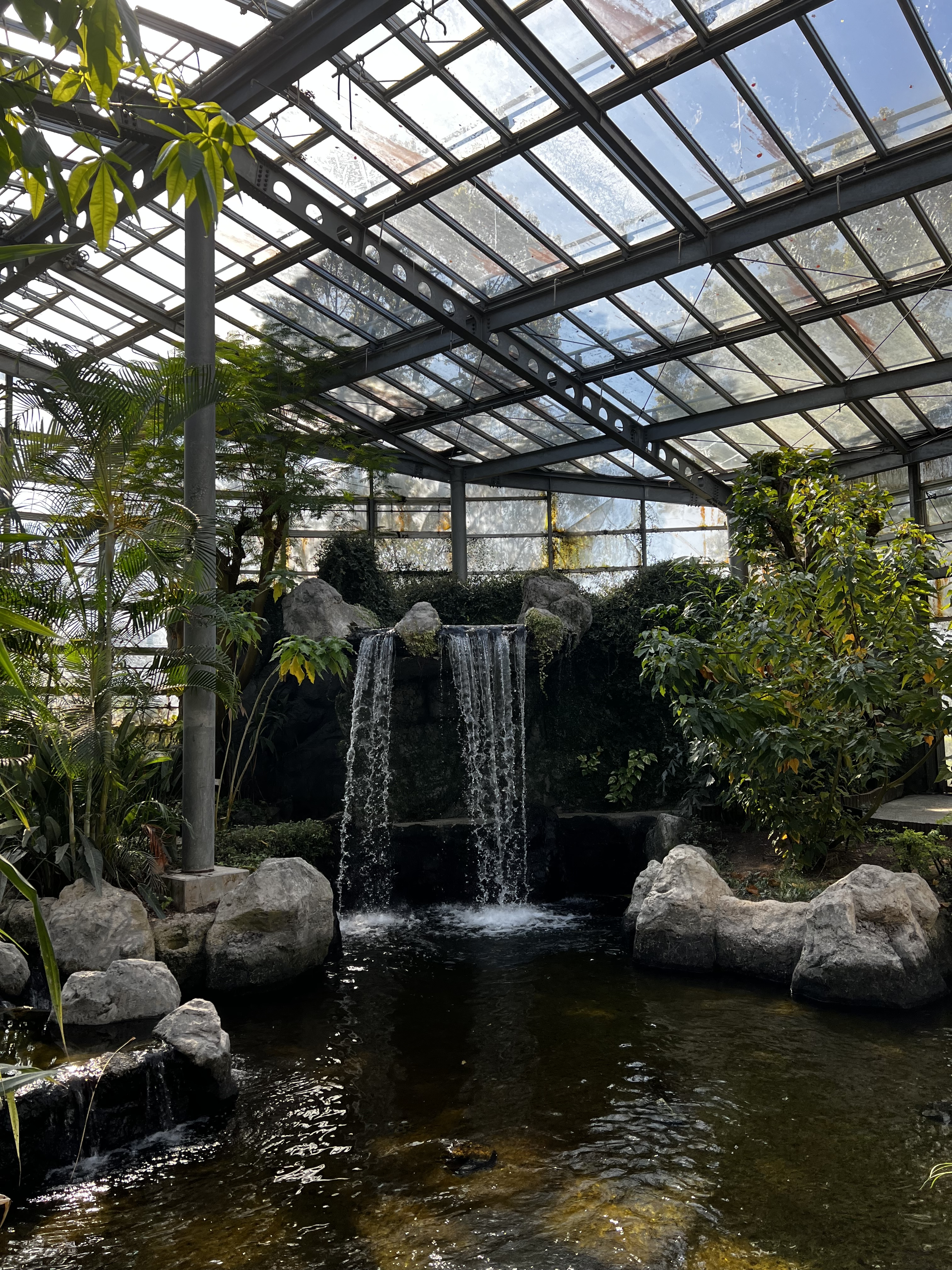
The interior of the park’s greenhouse, featuring an indoor waterfall.

As of December 2025, the zoo contains 40 animal exhibits and houses 550 animals across 110 species. It features mammals, birds, and amphibians. The zoological park houses many species of exotic animals, such as a lion, a tiger and formerly a polar bear, which was sent to Kushiro Zoo in 2025. The zookeepers issue a monthly newsletter to update the public on the animals.

As of February 2025, the botanical gardens contain 70,000 plants across 700 species. The park has a greenhouse called “Hana-no-Kyukeijo” (Japanese: 花の休憩所) that houses tropical and subtropical plants. In the greenhouse, a sloth is also housed there. In front of the greenhouse, there is a field of flowers with a clock tower as its centerpiece.

== See also ==
List of zoos in Japan
