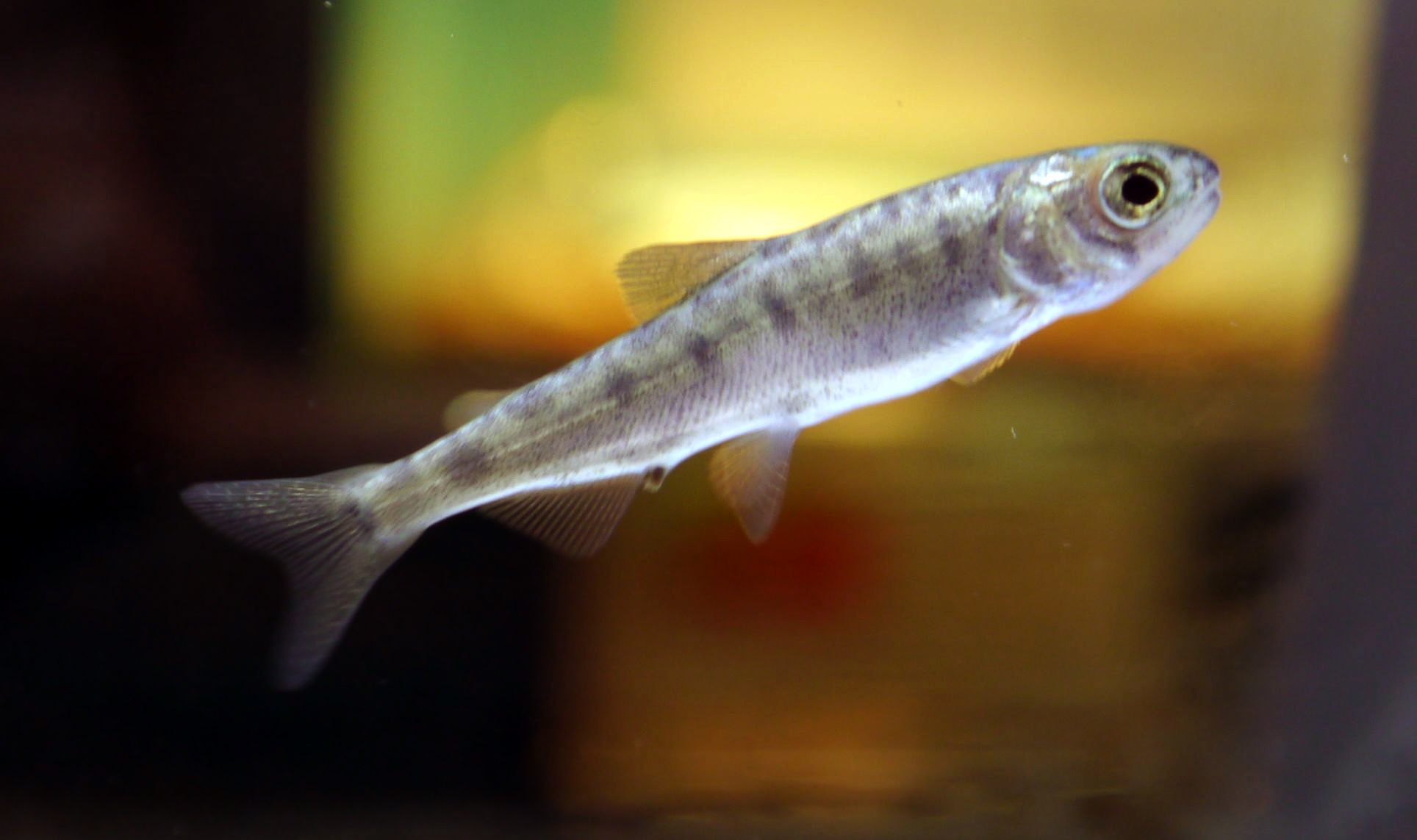
- A juvenile kunimasu at the Fuji Yusui no Sato Aquarium

Conservation status
- Extinct in the Wild (IUCN 3.1)

Scientific classification
- Kingdom: Animalia
- Phylum: Chordata
- Class: Actinopterygii
- Order: Salmoniformes
- Family: Salmonidae
- Genus: Oncorhynchus
- Species: O. kawamurae

Binomial name
- Oncorhynchus kawamurae D. S. Jordan & E. A. McGregor, 1925

= Oncorhynchus kawamurae =

Species of fish

Black kokanee (Oncorhynchus kawamurae), or kunimasu (国鱒; "[Japanese] national trout") in Japanese, is a species of landlocked Pacific trout in Japan that was thought to be extinct for 70 years before being rediscovered in 2010. The species was originally endemic to Lake Tazawa, Akita Prefecture, but was translocated to Lake Saiko in an attempt to save the species. These efforts were only discovered to have been successful in 2010 when nine specimens were captured by a team of researchers including a celebrity biologist, 'Sakana-kun'.

Oncorhynchus kawamurae is related to the sockeye salmon (Oncorhynchus nerka) and has been earlier treated as its subspecies O. n. kawamurae. The fish is dark olive with black spots on its back, and grows to approximately one foot (30 centimetres) in length. This species has a long, slim and flat body shape but experiences changes in color and shape depending on the sex and life stage. Kunimasu also has a distinct breeding season, fewer pyloric caeca, and more gill-rakers which distinguish it from O. nerka.

== History ==
The Kunimasu species was originally endemic to a single location, Lake Tazawa in Akita Prefecture, Japan. In 1935, eyed eggs (a fertilized stage of eggs) of this fish species were introduced into several other lakes in Japan, including Lake Saiko, Yamanashi Prefecture, in an attempt at translocation that was thought to have been unsuccessful. In 1940, water was introduced into Lake Tazawa from Tama River to increase hydroelectric power generation from the local dam. The introduced water was strongly acidic and killed the entire population of Kunimasu, as salmon are highly sensitive to changes in pH. The Kunimasu species of salmon were thought to be extinct for the next 70 years. But in 2010, nine specimens of the fish were discovered by a group of scientists in Lake Saiko, which are assumed to be descendants of the original eyed eggs introduced in the 1930s.

Kunimasu is very closely related to another species of land-locked sockeye salmon Oncorhynchus nerka, commonly called kokanee or Himemasu. Himemasu had been introduced many times to Lake Saiko as well, and with its similar appearance to Kunimasu there were questions as to whether the newly discovered specimens were actually Kunimasu or a hybrid form of the two salmon species. However, the two species were determined to be reproductively isolated, meaning the specimens discovered in 2010 were in fact surviving Kunimasu. This was originally determined from the Kunimasu's distinct breeding season, fewer number of pyloric caeca, higher number of gill-rakers, and spawning body color. Later, these results were confirmed using DNA sequencing.

== Ecology ==
=== Feeding and habitat ===
Currently there is little information on the behavior and ecology of Kunimasu as few studies were conducted on the species before its rediscovery in 2010. It is suspected however, that Kunimasu feeds on mesopelagic or benthopelagic zooplankton similar to Himemasu inhabiting the same area. This is supported by their number of gill rakers and the observed habitat preference of the species to occupy cold, deep lake water.

Kunimasu are found exclusively in landlocked freshwater habitats such as lakes, and are benthopelagic meaning they inhabit the water just above the bottom of the lake. This species was originally endemic to Lake Tazawa in Akita Prefecture, Japan, but are now exclusively found in Lake Saiko, which is about 310 miles (500 kilometres) south of Lake Tazawa.

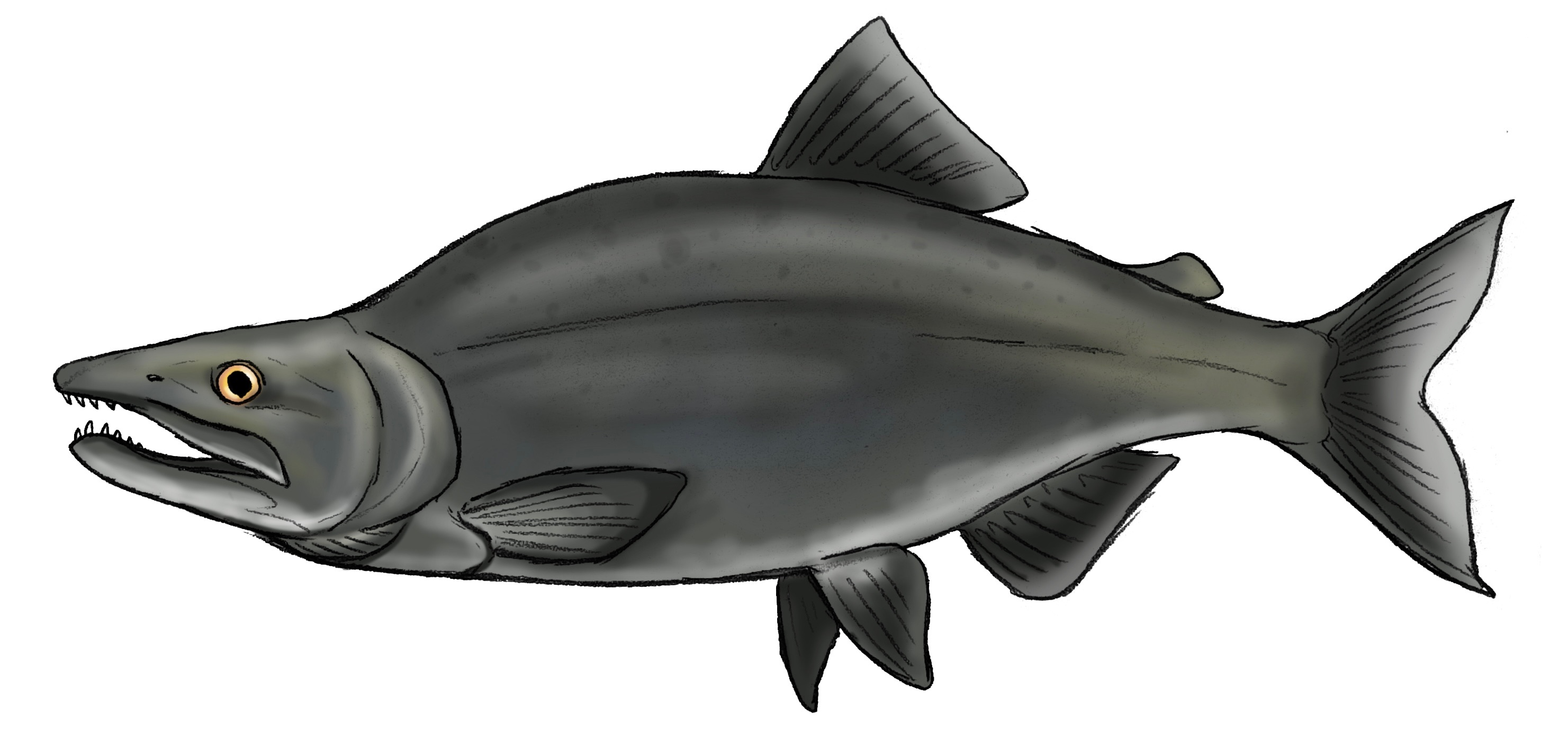
Illustration of adult

=== Morphology and life cycle ===
Kunimasu have black spots and an olive to dark grey color, except while spawning when they become a dark olive green. In order to protect their gills, the Kunimasu can have up to 43 gill rakers. They can also have up to 59 pyloric caeca, which supports their digestion but is a lower number when compared to other Oncorhynchus species. Kunimasu grow to a length of 30 cm as adults.

As Kunimasu grow and enter different life stages they experience changes in morphology, including in color and size. During their mature and pre-spawning state, both male and female Kunimasu have long, slim, and flat bodies. However, they have minor differences in snout length, where males typically have a slightly long pointed snout and females possess a shorter snout. During spawning, the bodies of male and female Kunimasu undergo morphological changes that differ among fish according to their size and range, but generally consist of the appearance of a humpback and concave snout. The spawning females also have the distinction of a larger mouth.

Spawning occurs at depths of 30 to 40 meters in winter and spring, and during this time the physiology of the fish often changes. The females prepare their spawning beds by undulating their bodies, which can damage the lobes of the caudal fin.

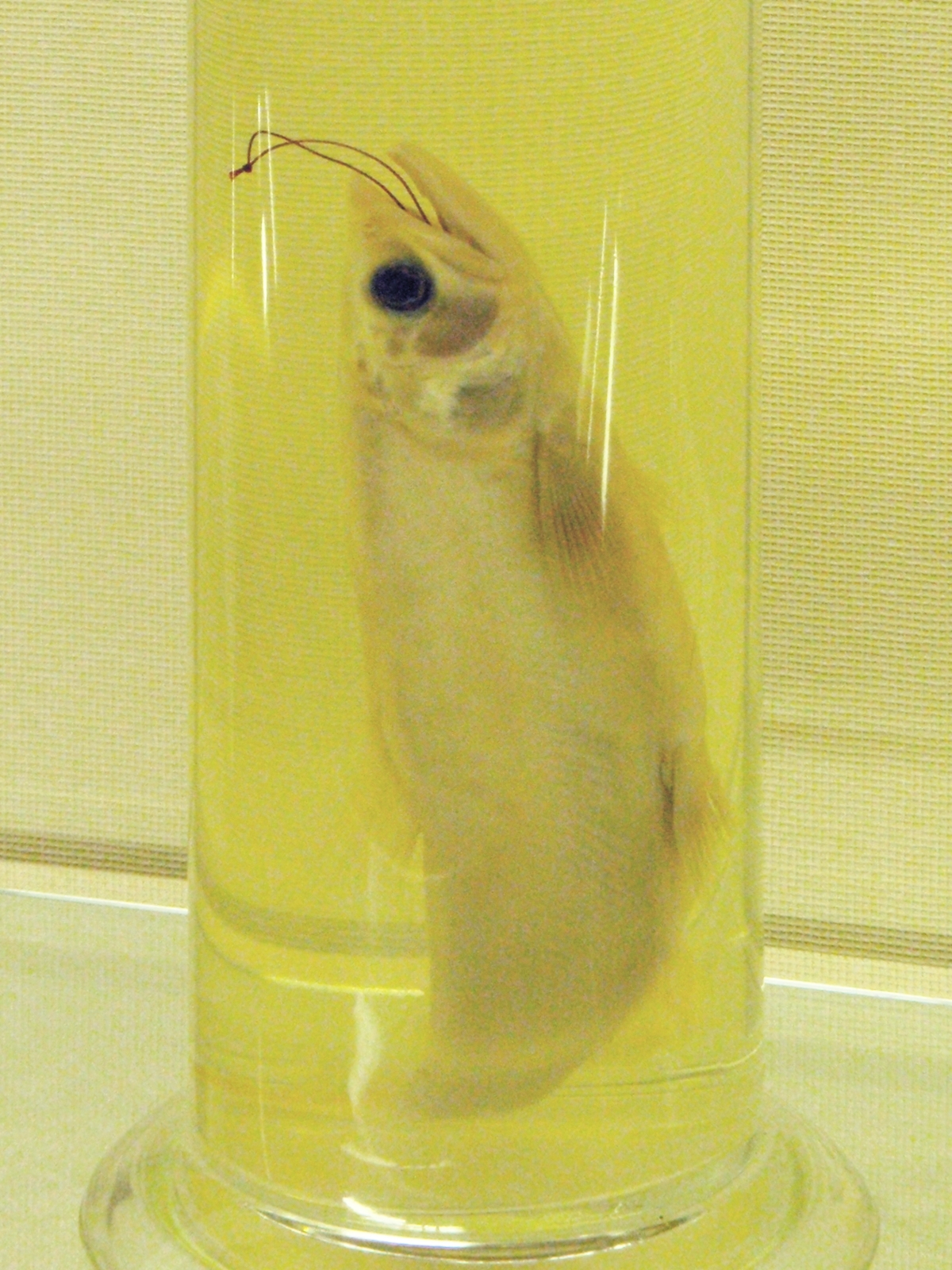
A preserved specimen
