= Matsue Vogel Park =

Coordinates: 35°28′34.5″N 132°56′38.5″E

Shimane Vogel Park Japanese: 松江フォーゲルパーク
- Interactive map of Shimane Vogel Park; Japanese: 松江フォーゲルパーク
- Location: Shimane Prefecture, Sea of Japan

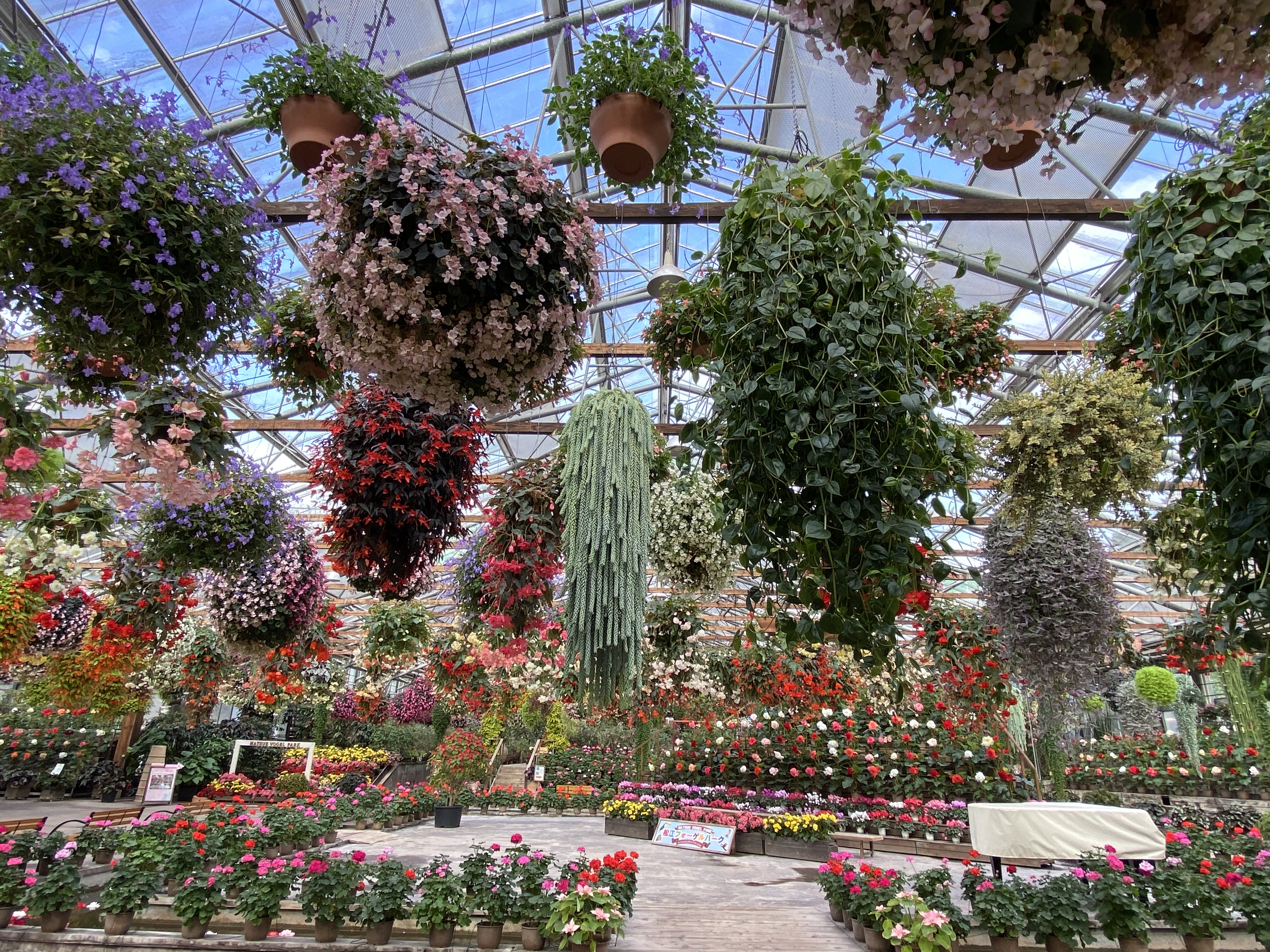
Center Greenhouse of Matsue Vogel Park

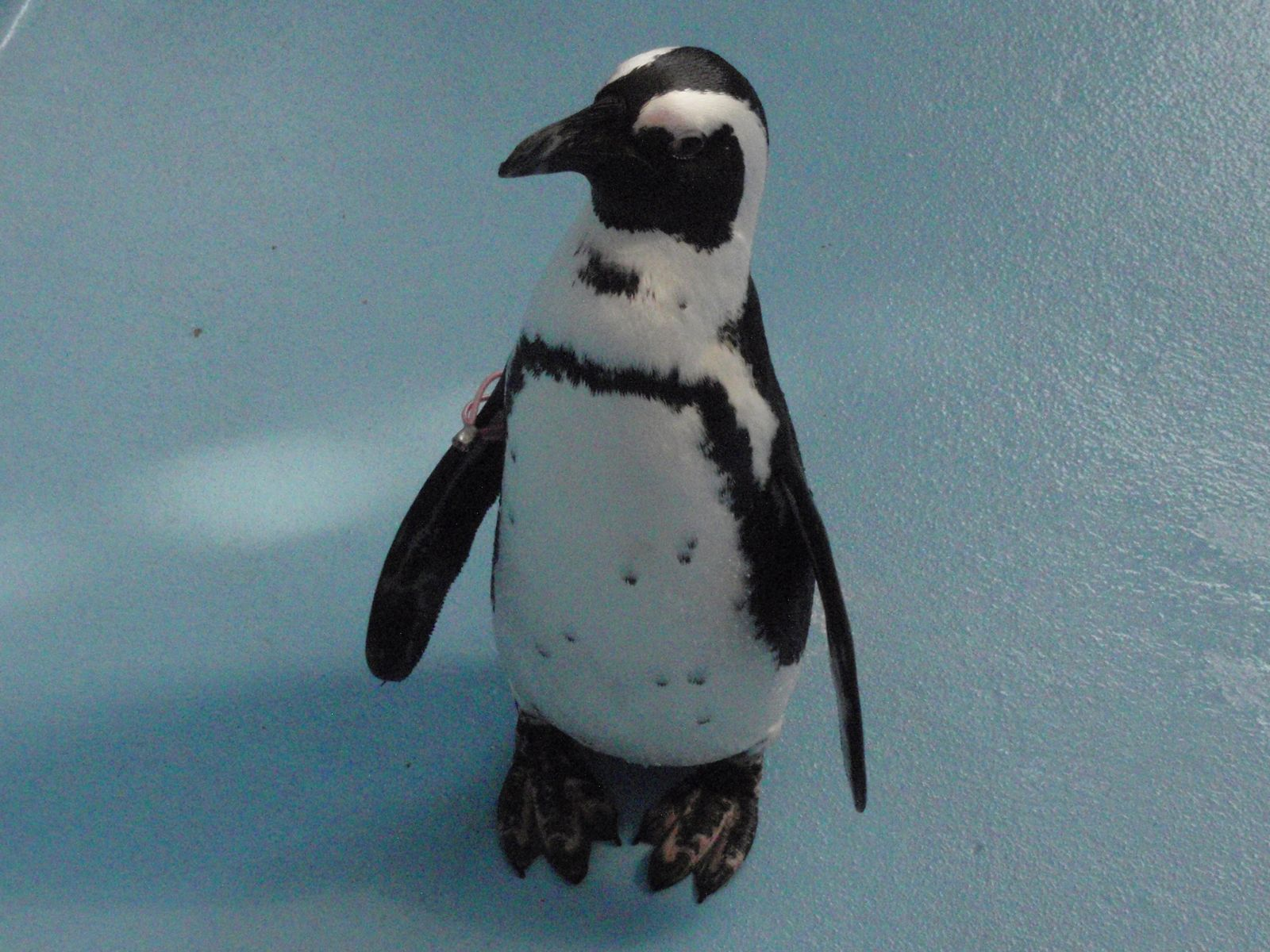
African penguin at the park.

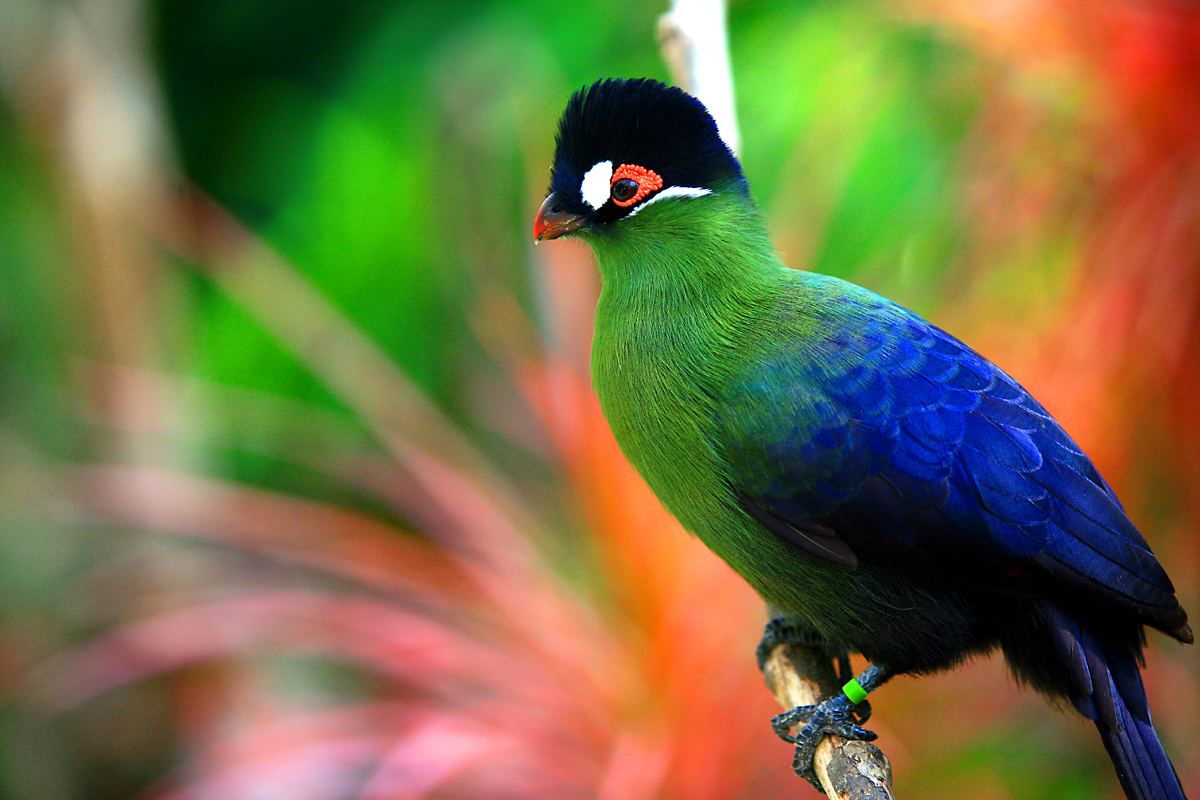
Hartlaub's Turaco at the park.

Shimane Vogel Park, or Matsue Vogel Park (Japanese: 松江フォーゲルパーク), is an aviary park in Shimane Prefecture, on the Sea of Japan. Located on the north shore of Lake Shinji, it has paved walkways between four aviaries holding tropical birds; mostly toucans, turacos, hornbills and ibises. The park is also home to various birds from around the world, including rare and exotic birds. There are also a number of waterfowl to be found in the aquatic birds aviary. Vogel Park also includes such birds as emus and penguins. An owl flight show is exhibited four times a day.

The park is known for its costumed penguin parades.

Vogel Park features one of the largest greenhouses in Japan, housing a diverse array of flowers that bloom year-round. Visitors can admire flowers such as Begonias, Fuchsias, and Coleus while exploring the park.
