= Fukuyama City Zoo =

Coordinates: 34.524131°N 133.279138°E

- Interactive map of Fukuyama City Zoo
- Location: 276-1, Fukuda, Ashida-cho, Fukuyama, Hiroshima
- Memberships: JAZA
- Website: http://www.fukuyamazoo.jp/

Fukuyama City Zoo (福山市立動物園, Fukuyama Shiritsu Dōbutsuen) is a zoological park in Fukuyama, Hiroshima, Japan.

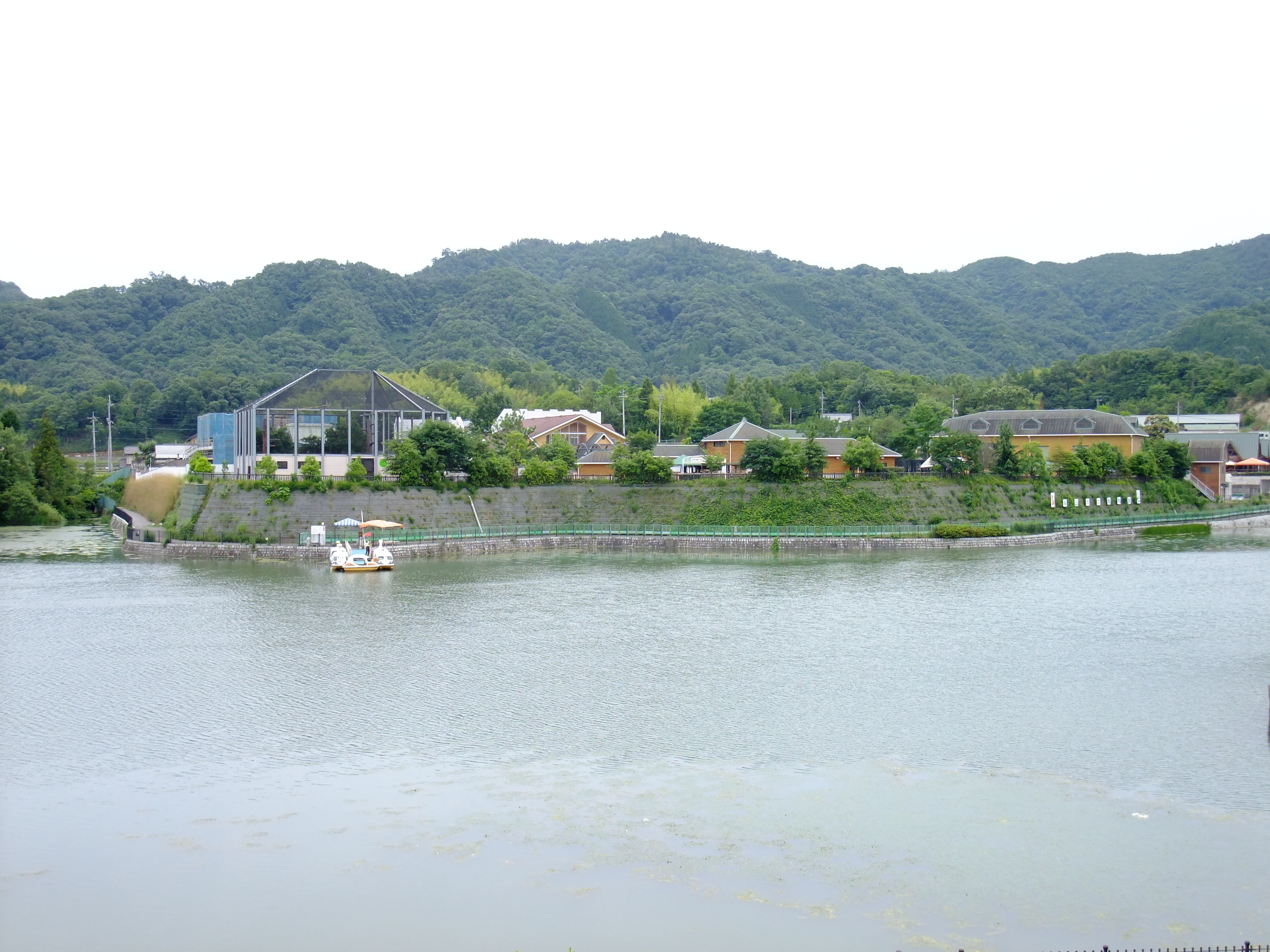
Fukuyama city zoo

== Overview ==
Fukuyama City Zoo has opened on April 1, 1978, in Ashida-cho, Fukuyama, Hiroshima in Japan.

Animals in the zoo's collection include lion-tailed macaques, squirrel monkeys, ring-tailed lemurs, lions, leopards, coyotes, ostriches, Hartmann's mountain zebras, reticulated giraffes, southern cassowaries and emus.

=== Hours ===
- From 9:00 a.m. to 4:30 p.m.

=== Holidays ===
- Every Tuesday

== See also ==
- Japanese Association of Zoos and Aquariums
