= Fuji Yusui no Sato Aquarium =

Fuji Spring Water Aquarium
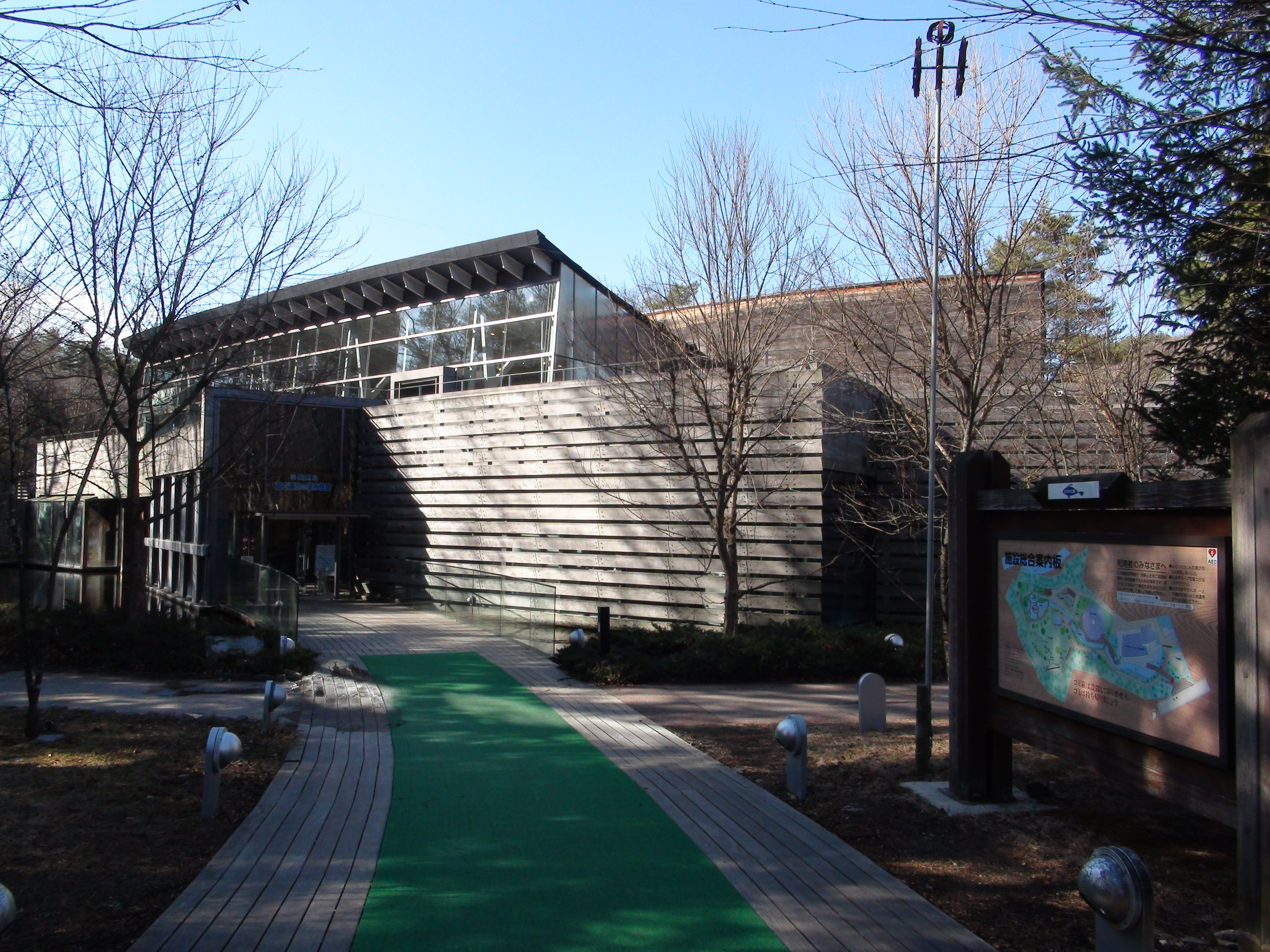
- Entrance
- Interactive map of Fuji Spring Water Aquarium
- 34°28′54″N 136°50′45″E
- Date opened: April 2001
- Location: Minamitsuru District, Yamanashi Prefecture, Japan
- Land area: 1,446 m^{2} (15,560 sq ft)
- Total volume of tanks: 300,000 litres (79,000 US gal)
- Memberships: JAZA
- Management: Kikyoya
- Website: www.morinonakano-suizokukan.com

Fuji Yusui no Sato Aquarium(山梨県立富士湧水の里水族館) or Fuji Spring Water Aquarium is a prefectural public aquarium specializing in freshwater fish, located in Oshino-mura, Minami-tsuru-gun, Yamanashi Prefecture. It is a member of the Japanese Association of Zoos and Aquariums (JAZA).

== History ==
Opened in 2001 as the first aquarium in the prefecture. On April 1, 2009, the aquarium began to be managed and operated by Kikyoya under the designated manager system.

On July 20, 2012, the aquarium exhibited for a limited time artificially hatched juvenile Black kokanee, which were rediscovered in 2010 in Lake Saiko, Yamanashi Prefecture, and were once recognized as an extinct species.

== Research and conservation ==
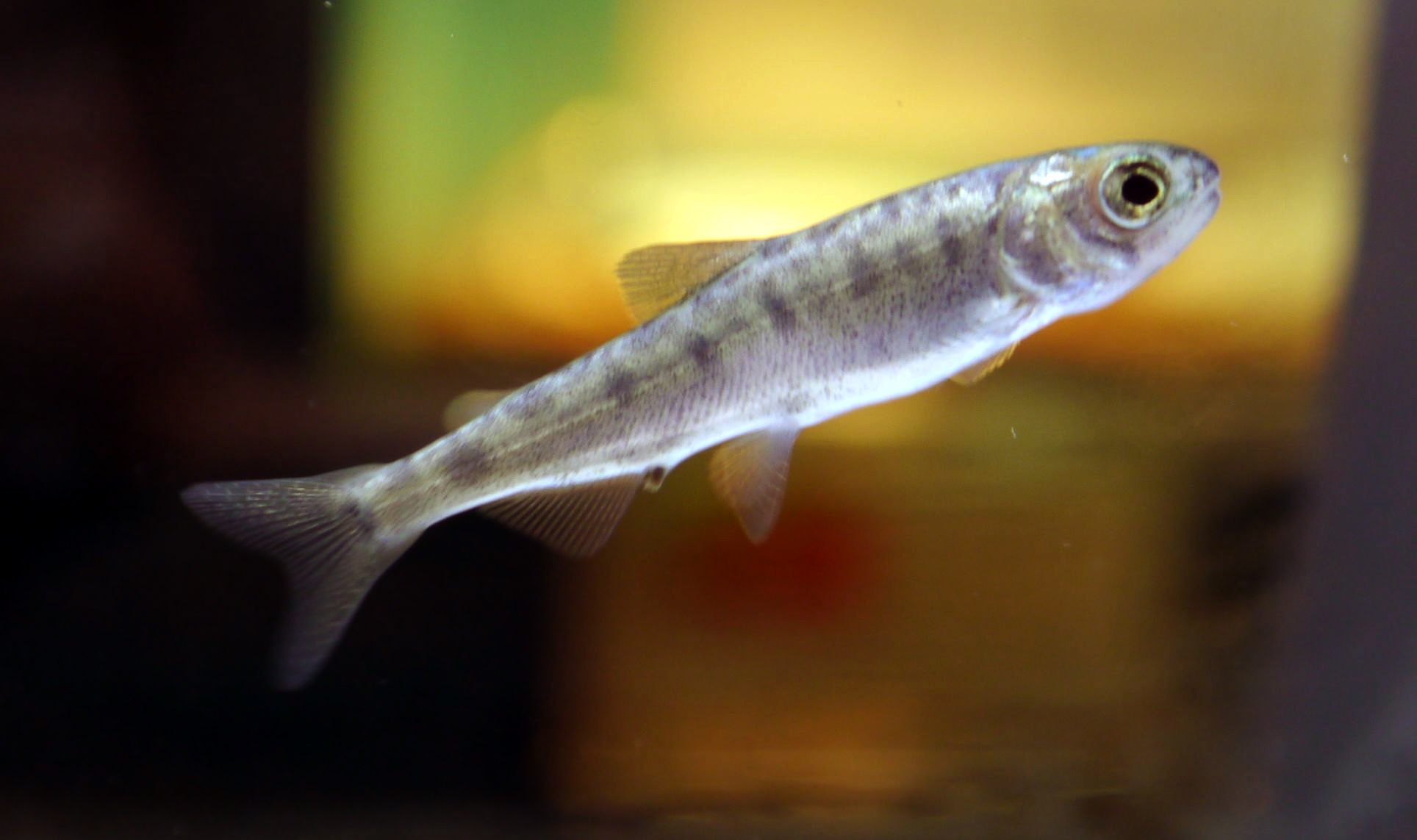
Black kokanee fry on exhibit

The center breeds and exhibits freshwater fish and aquatic organisms living in rivers, lakes, and marshes, with a focus on freshwater fish farmed in Yamanashi Prefecture. The museum also conducts habitat distribution surveys in the surrounding area and breeding trials of rare freshwater species such as Lefua echigonia.

Inside the museum, there is a double tank surrounded by stairs, with small fish (trout fry, etc.) on the inside and large fish such as stringfish and sturgeon swimming on the outside. The "River Fish Tank" reproduces the river from its headwaters to its middle reaches, in accordance with the topography of Yamanashi Prefecture, which has no estuaries.

Outside, there is a pond where carp and other fish swim, and the border between the pond and the museum is made of glass, so that visitors can observe the fish swimming in the pond from inside the museum while sitting on benches.

Kikyouya, the designated manager of the aquarium, has been offering tours of its own factory since the 1990s, and has utilized this know-how in the operation of the aquarium.

The aquarium's large aquarium uses spring water from Mt. Fuji for breeding water, and exhibits mainly freshwater creatures native to Yamanashi Prefecture, including Craspedacusta sowerbii and Eurasian harvest mouse.
