= Muroto Schoolhouse Aquarium =

Muroto Schoolhouse Aquarium むろと廃校水族館
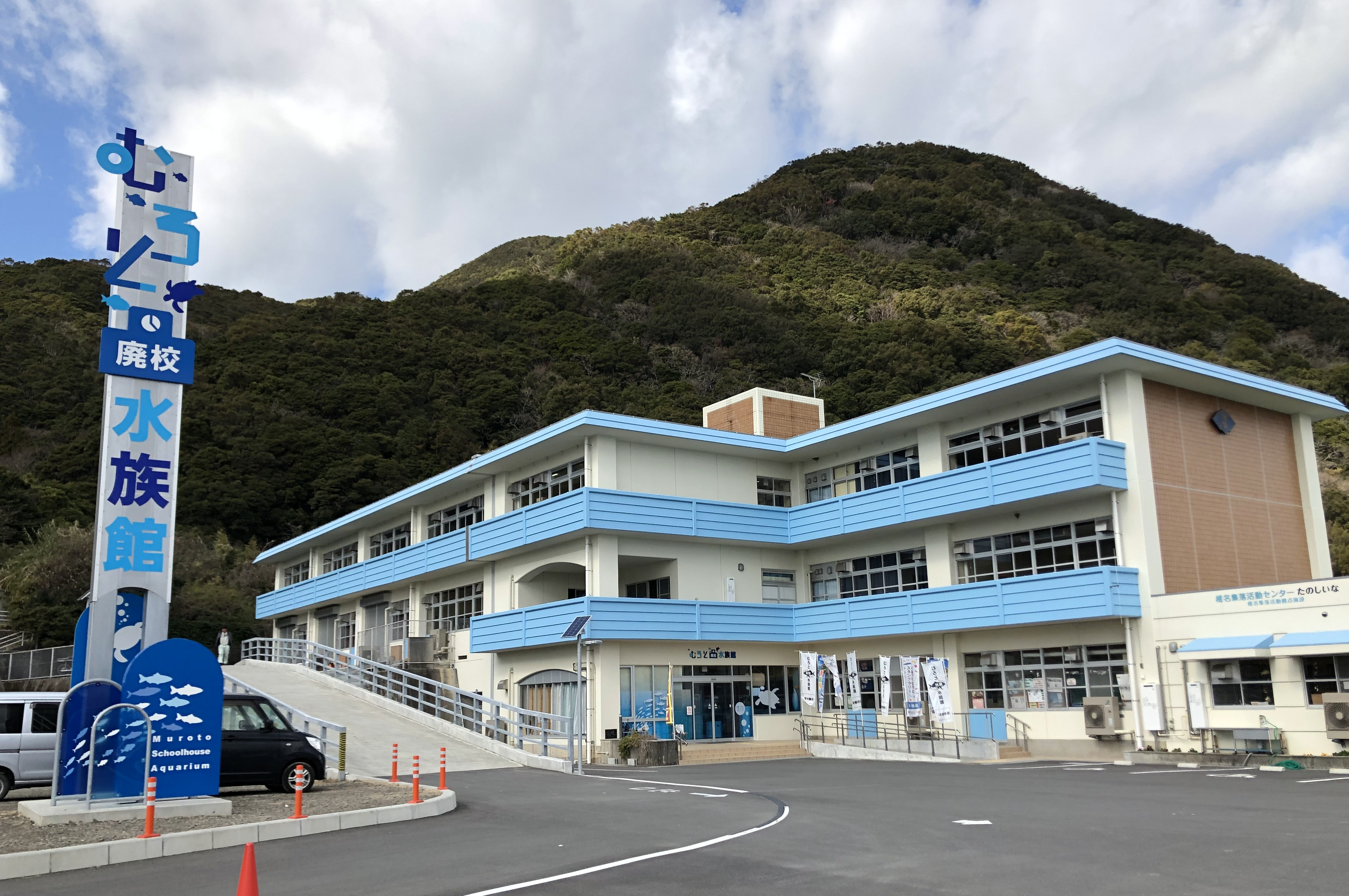
- Exterior
- Interactive map of Muroto Schoolhouse Aquarium むろと廃校水族館
- 33°19′33″N 134°11′42″E
- Date opened: April 2018
- Location: Muroto, kochi, Japan
- Land area: 21,975 m^{2} (236,540 sq ft)
- No. of animals: 1000
- No. of species: 50
- Management: Japan Sea Turtle Council
- Website: Muroto Schoolhouse Aquarium on X

Muroto Schoolhouse Aquarium(むろと廃校水族館) opened on April 26, 2018, after renovating the former Muroto Municipal Shiina Elementary School (founded in 1874; closed in 2001, closed in 2006) in Muroto-misaki Town, Muroto City, Kochi Prefecture, Japan. It is operated and managed by members of the Japan Sea Turtle Council, a non-profit organization (NPO).

The aquarium breeds 1,000 saltwater fish of about 50 species, all of which were acquired from local fishermen. Although small in size, the aquarium often brings in rare fish and large marine creatures, including hammerhead sharks, tiger sharks, loggerhead turtles, and green turtles, some of which can be touched by visitors.

The aquarium is accredited as a Registered Museum by the Museum Act from Ministry of Education, Culture, Sports, Science and Technology.

== History ==
History of the Museum and After its Opening Muroto City invested 500 million yen to develop this facility with the aim of revitalizing the city by using closed schools.

The Japan Sea Turtle Conservation Society took on the management of the facility, partly to use it as a place to present the scientific research that has been conducted in Muroto since 2001, and partly out of regret that two elementary schools in the city were closed during that time.

Despite the fact that there were no animals to attract visitors, the number of visitors exceeded initial expectations, and on July 22, less than three months after opening, the total number of visitors exceeded 30,000, and on August 11, three and a half months later, the initial target of 40,000 had been reached. On October 30 of the same year, the number of visitors reached the 100,000 mark. In 2020, the museum was temporarily closed to prevent the spread of the new coronavirus infection (COVID-19), but reopened in mid-May, and the total number of visitors since its opening exceeded 320,000 in June.

== Exhibits ==
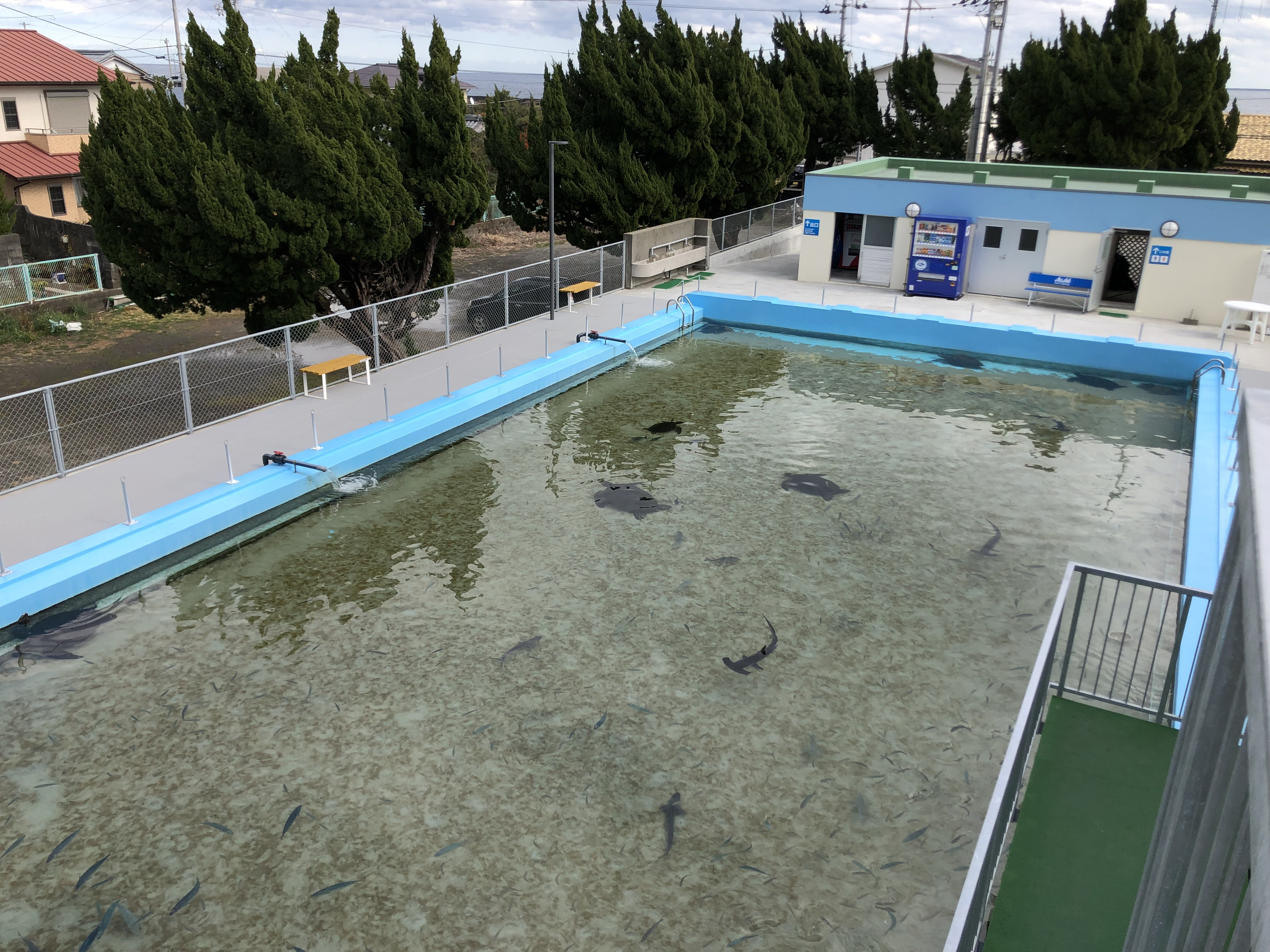
25-meter pool tank

Fish and shellfish are displayed in tanks installed in classrooms in the old school building, in the old washrooms, and in the 25-meter pool.

Most of the more than 1,000 sea creatures of 50 species on display were caught by local fishermen in fixed nets or by the staff themselves. The 25-meter pool is home to sharks and eagle rays such as hammerhead sharks, the large circular tank is home to mackerel, Ocean sunfish, and small stingrays, while the original classroom houses lionfish and moray eels.

The museum also keeps sea turtles, which is the name of the organization for which it is the designated manager.

In addition to ecological exhibits, specimens of deep-sea fish and minke whales are also on display.

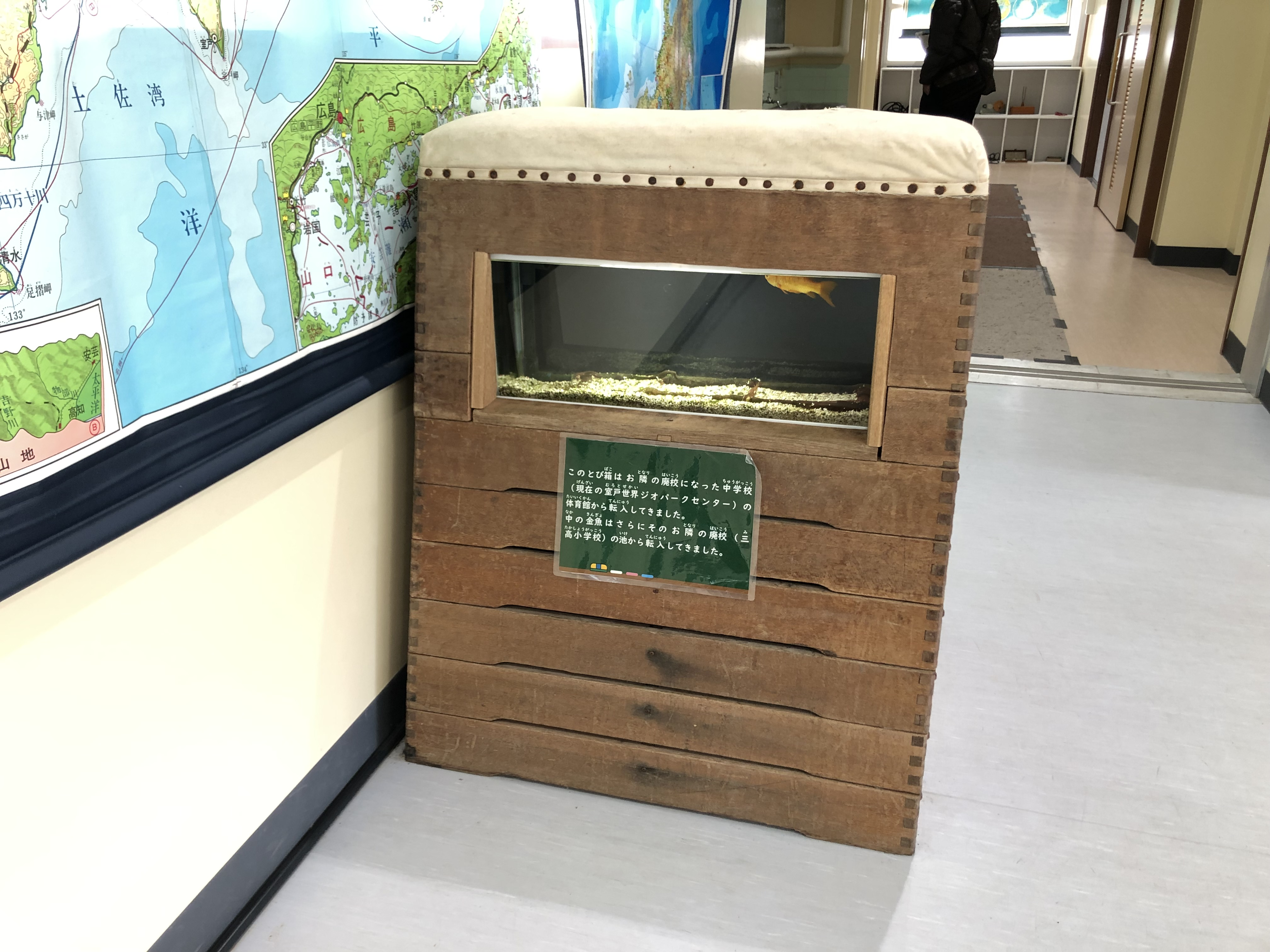

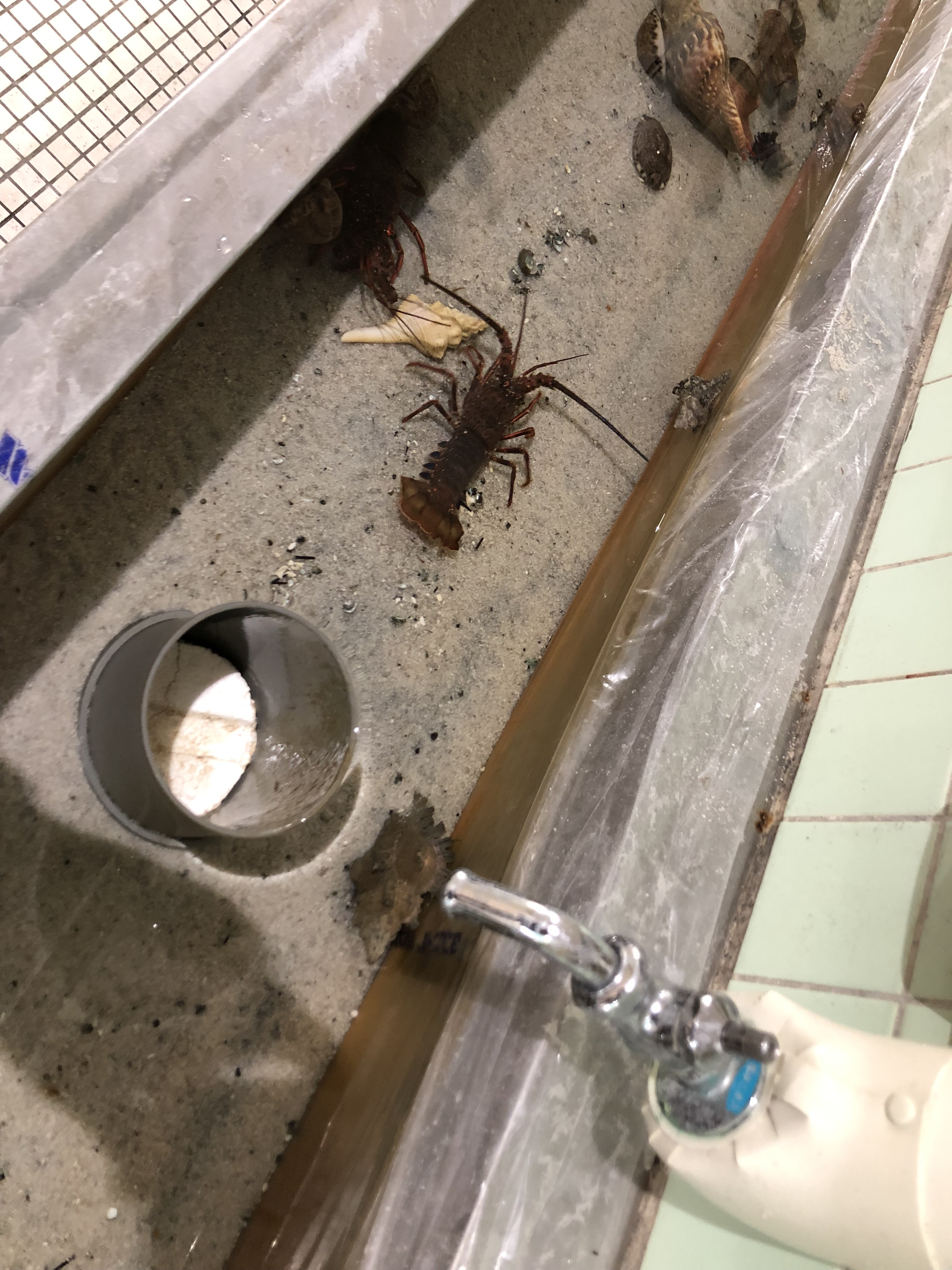

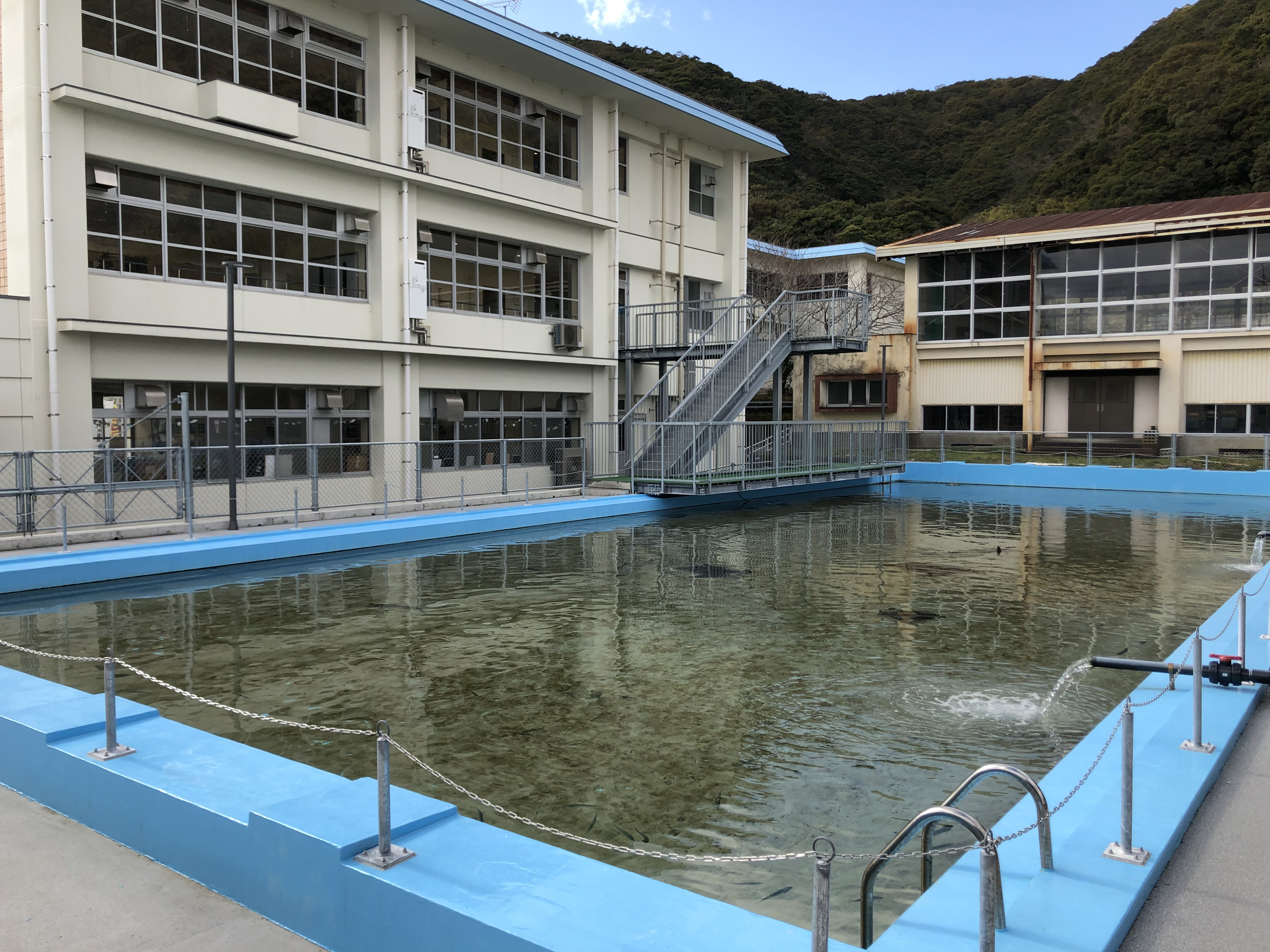

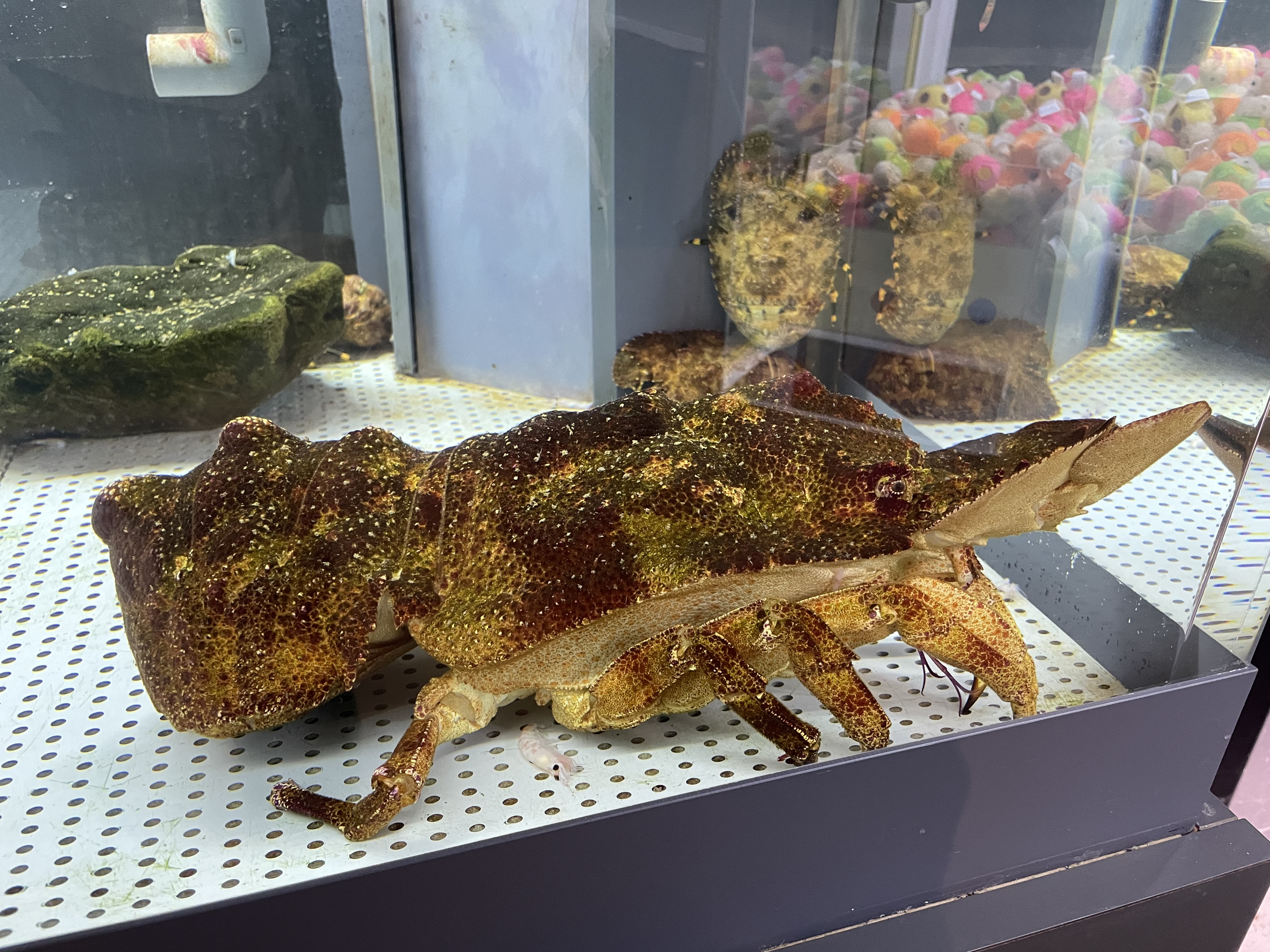

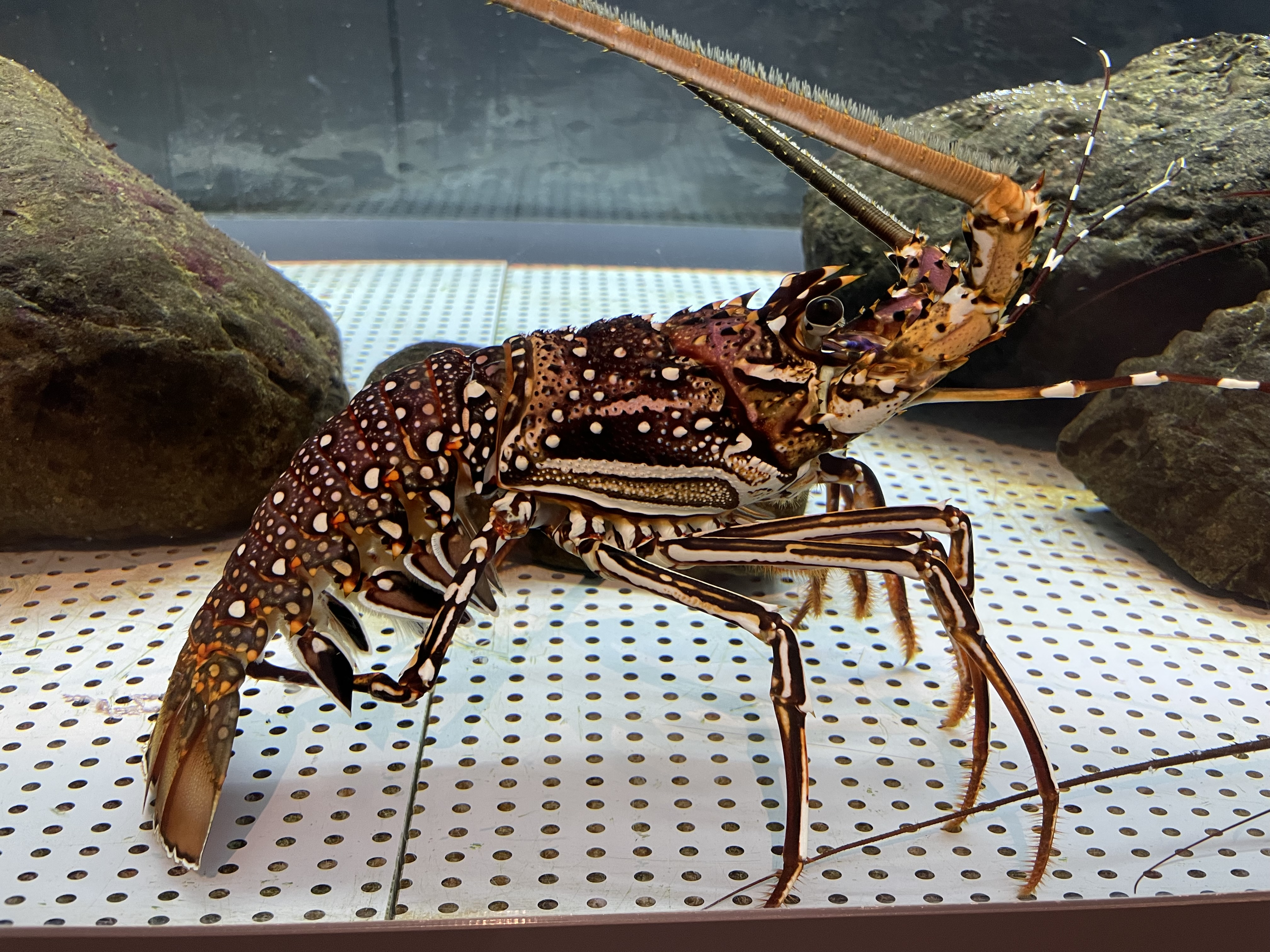

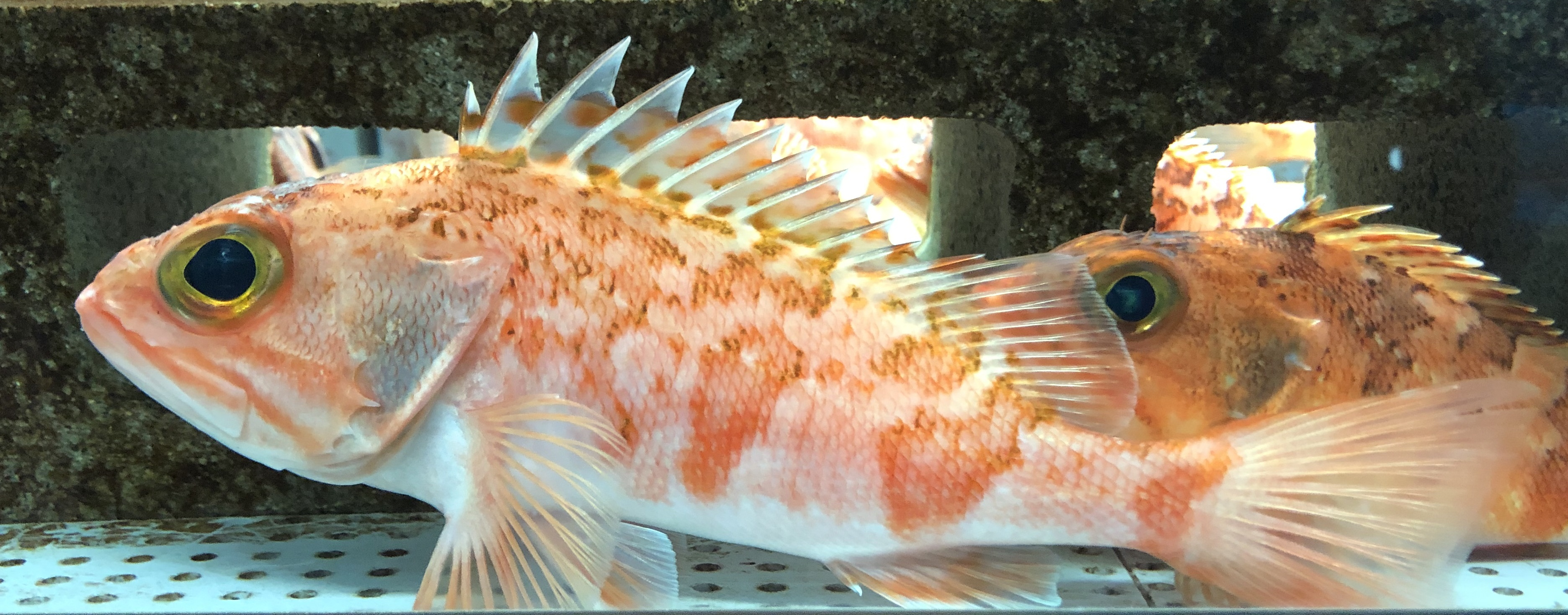

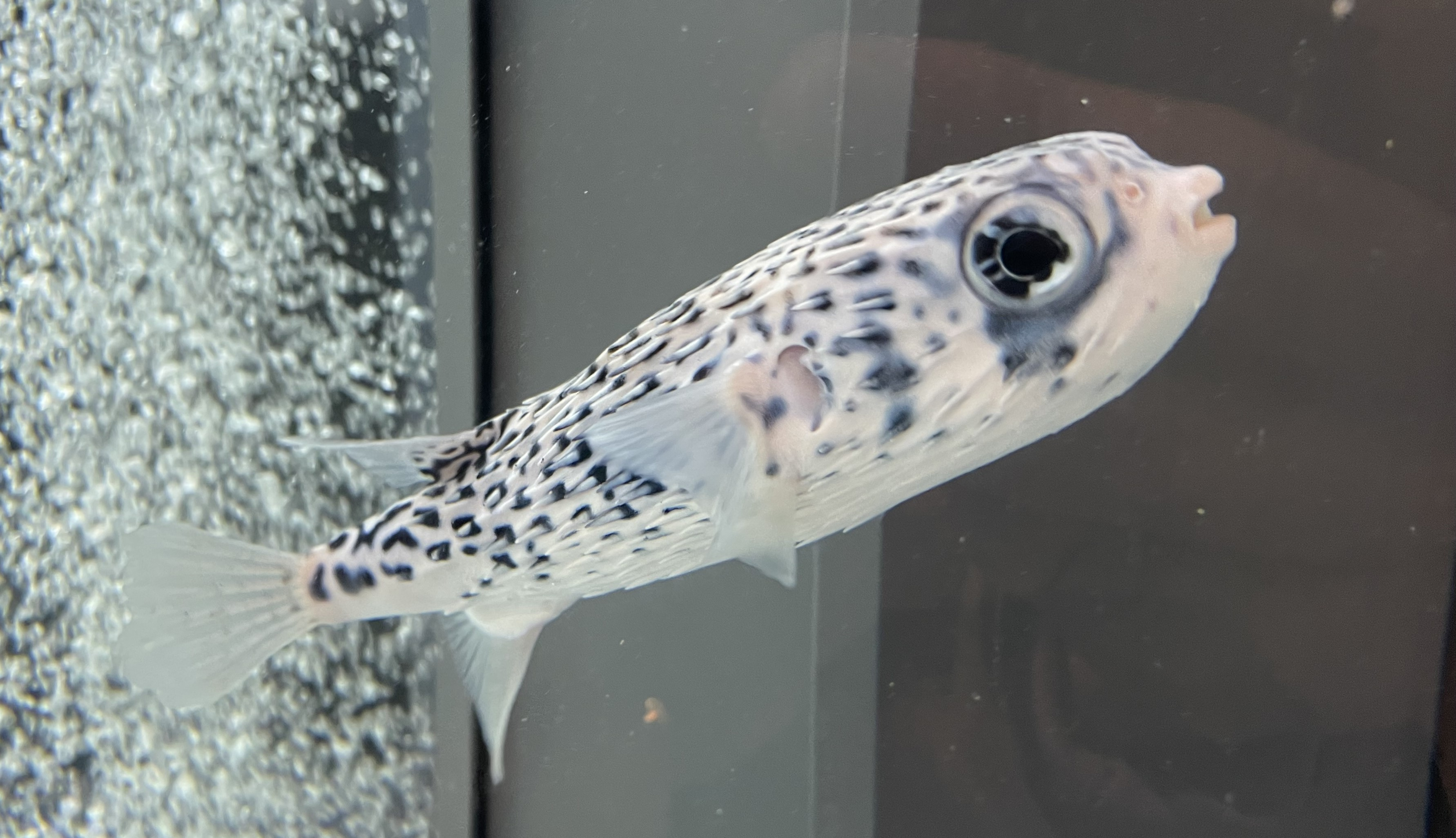

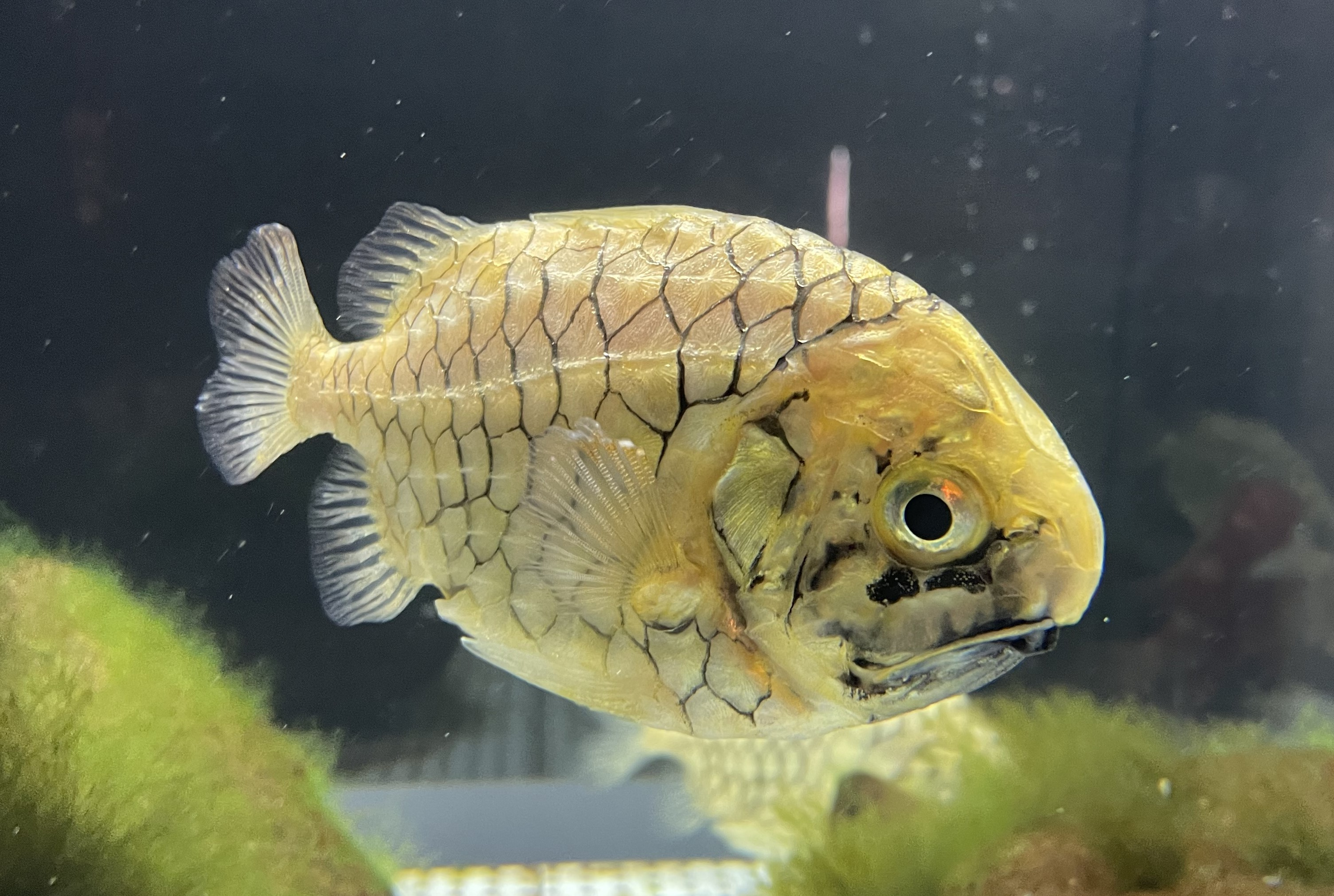
