= The Ice Aquarium =

- 氷の水族館
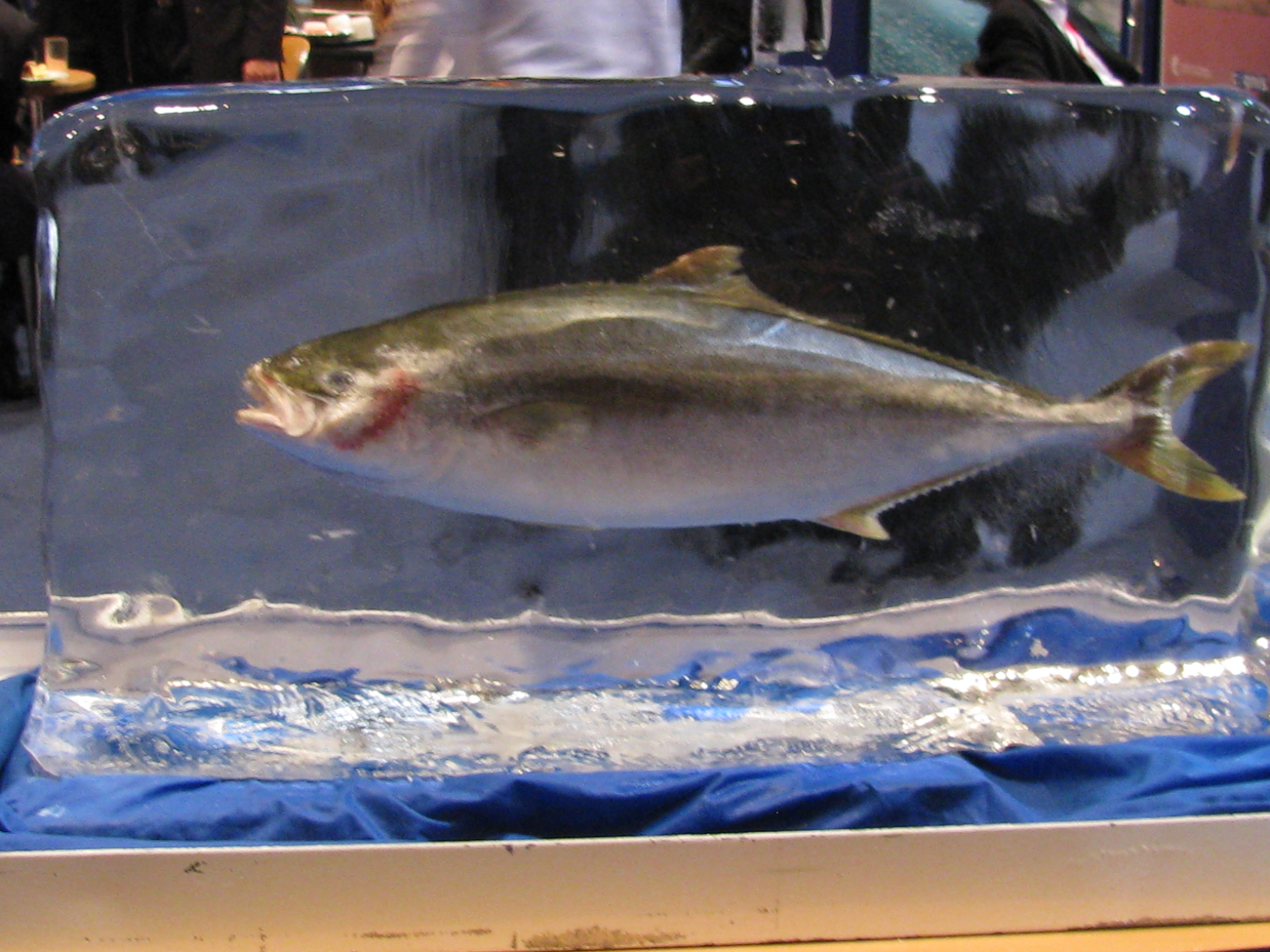
- Exhibit at The Ice Aquarium
- Location: Kesennuma, Miyagi, Japan
- Coordinates: 38°54′0.3″N 141°34′46.3″E

The Ice Aquarium (氷の水族館, Kōri no Suizokukan) is a tourist attraction in the north-eastern port of Kesennuma, Miyagi, Japan, operated by the Okamoto Ice Refrigeration Plant. It features approximately 450 marine creatures that were flash-frozen into blocks of ice after being caught by local fishermen. The attraction was established in 2002. It showcases more than 70 different species of sea creatures, including crab, squid and octopus, Due to the extreme cold temperature inside the Ice Aquarium, visitors are advised to stay for only five minutes.
