= Edogawa Ward Natural Zoo =

Zoo in Tokyo Prefecture, Japan

Edogawa City Natural Zoo
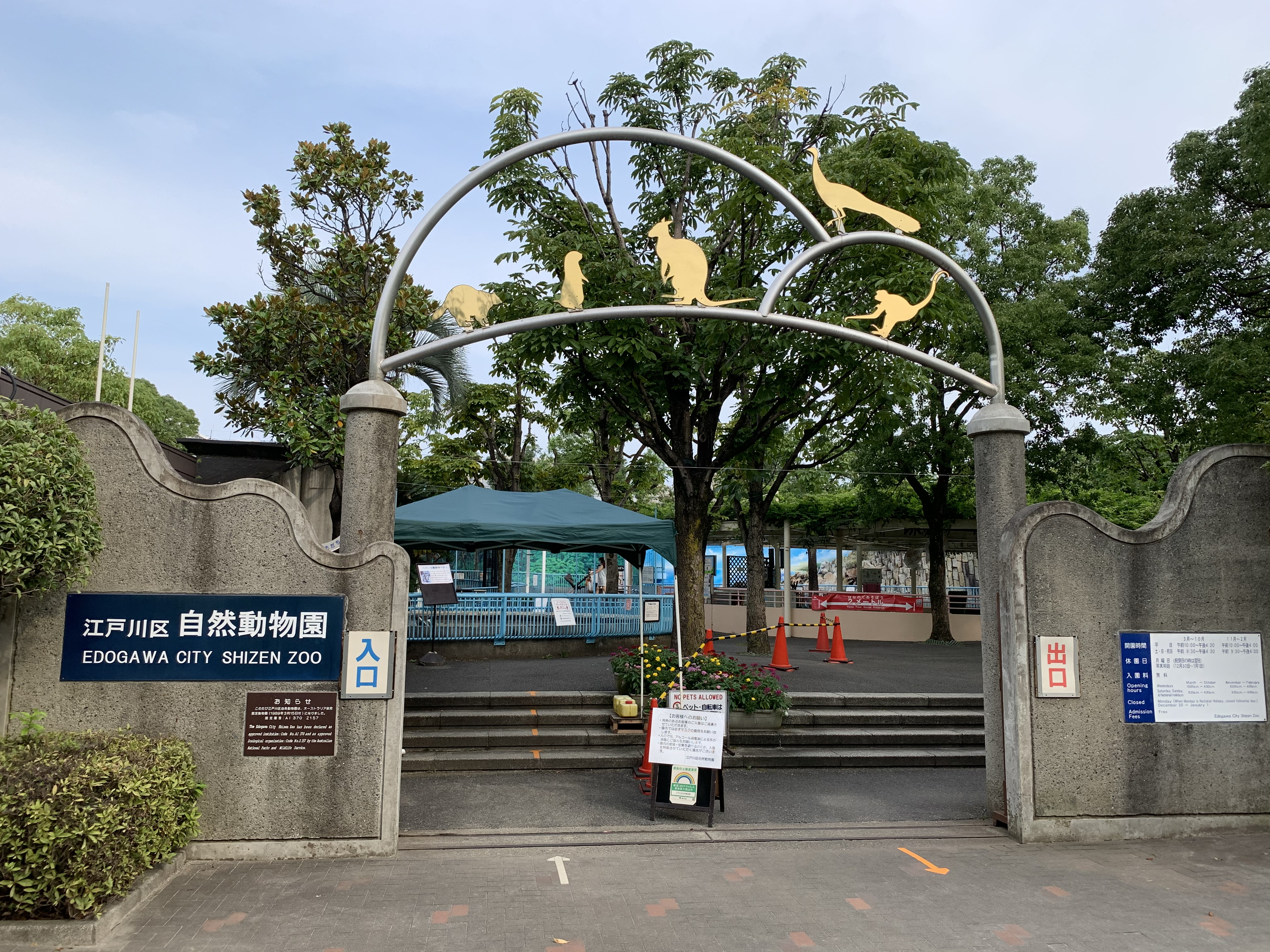
- Interactive map of Edogawa City Natural Zoo
- 35.6710°N 139.8584°E
- Owner: Edogawa City Environment Promotion Public Corporation, Edogawa Ward
- Website: edogawa-kankyozaidan.jp/zoo/

Edogawa City Natural Zoo (江戸川区自然動物園, Edokawaku-shizen-dōbu~tsuen) or Edogawa City Natural Zoo is a zoo located in Edogawa, Tokyo Prefecture, Japan.
