= Noble (surname) =

Noble is an English surname which commonly appears in multiple areas of the United Kingdom. The surname first appears in 1199, during the reign of Richard I and it is common in Edinburgh, Scotland.

== Notable people ==
Notable people with the surname include:

- Adil Hossain Noble, Bangladeshi actor and model
- Alexis Noble (1963–2025), Uruguayan footballer
- Alfred Noble (engineer) (1844–1914), American civil engineer
- Sir Andrew Noble, 1st Baronet (1831–1915), Scottish physicist
- Ann C. Noble, American sensory chemist
- Anne Noble (born 1954), New Zealand photographer
- Arthur Noble (1695–1746), Lieutenant-Colonel of the Massachusetts Bay Colonial Militia
- Barbara Noble (1907–2001), English publisher and novelist
- Bill Noble (1884–1937), Australian rugby player
- Brian Noble (disambiguation)
  - Brian Noble (bishop) (1936–2019), British Catholic bishop
  - Brian Noble (American football) (born 1962), American football player
  - Brian Noble (rugby league) (born 1961), English rugby player and coach
- Chelsea Noble (born 1964), American actress
- Christina Noble (born 1944), Irish children's rights campaigner
- Colin Noble (racing driver) (born 1996), British racing driver
- Dave Noble (1900–1983), American football player
- David Noble (disambiguation)
  - David A. Noble (1802–1876), American politician from Michigan
  - David F. Noble (1945–2010), historian of technology
  - David L. Noble, engineer at IBM who invented the floppy disk
  - David W. Noble (1925–2018), historiographer and historian of thought
  - David Noble (Australian footballer) (born 1967), Australian football player
  - David Noble (canyoner) (born 1965), canyoner
  - David Noble (footballer, born 1982), British football player
- Denis Noble (born 1936), British physiologist
- Dudy Noble (1893–1963), American athlete, coach, and administrator
- Elmer Noble (1909–2001), American biologist
- Emma Noble (born 1971), actress and model
- Frank Noble (born 1945), British footballer
- Gene Noble, American R&B singer
- Gladwyn Kingsley Noble (1894–1940), American zoologist
- Guy Noble, Australian conductor and pianist
- Harriet Noble (1851–1919), American academic and suffragist
- Sir Iain Noble, 3rd Baronet (1935–2010), champion of Scottish Gaelic from Skye
- James Noble (senator) (1785–1831), American politician
- James Noble (actor) (1922–2016), American actor
- James H. Noble (1851–1912), American physician and politician
- Jamie Noble (born 1976), wrestler
- John Noble (born 1948), Australian actor
- John Noble (privateer) (died 1574), English privateer
- John H. Noble, American inmate of the Soviet gulag
- Jordan Bankston Noble (1800–1890), American soldier, public speaker, and former slave
- Lee Noble, British car designer and owner of Noble Automotive
- Marc Noble (1927–1991), Scouting official
- Mark Noble (born 1987), English footballer
- Maurice Noble (1911–2001), animation artist
- Matthew Noble (1818–1876), British sculptor
- Mike Noble (1930–2018), British comic artist and illustrator
- Morgan Noble, American politician
- Monty Noble (1873–1940), Australian cricketer
- Sir Percy Noble (1880–1955), Royal Navy officer who served in both World Wars
- Ray Noble (1903–1978), British bandleader, composer and actor
- Ray Noble (baseball) (1919–1998), Cuban baseball player
- Rayner Noble (born 1961), American baseball coach
- Reg Noble (1895–1962), American ice hockey player
- Redman (born Reginald Noble in 1970), American rapper
- Richard Noble (born 1946), Scottish land speed record holder
- Ross Noble (born 1976), British stand-up comedian
- Roy Noble (born 1942), Welsh radio and television broadcaster
- Sierra Noble (born 1990), Canadian musician
- T. Tertius Noble (1867–1953), British-born American organist and composer
- Trisha Noble (1944–2021), Australian singer and actress
- Walter Noble (1884–?), British flying ace
- Warren Noble (inventor), inventor of electric stove
- William Noble (disambiguation)
  - William H. Noble (1788–1850), American politician from New York
  - William Noble, 1st Baron Kirkley (1863–1935), English shipowner
  - William Noble (missionary) (1866–1945), American missionary in Korea
  - William Bonneau Noble (1780–1831), English landscape painter
  - William Clark Noble (1858–1938), American sculptor
  - William Noble (jockey) (1814–1897), English jockey

=== Fictional characters ===
- Donna Noble, a character in Doctor Who
