= Noble =

A noble is a member of the nobility.

Noble may also refer to:

== Places ==
=== Antarctica ===
- Noble Glacier, King George Island
- Noble Nunatak, Marie Byrd Land
- Noble Peak, Wiencke Island
- Noble Rocks, Graham Land

=== Australia ===
- Noble Island, Great Barrier Reef

=== United States ===
- Noble (SEPTA station), a railway station in Abington, Pennsylvania
- Noble, Illinois, a village
- Noble, Iowa, an unincorporated community
- Noble, Louisiana, a village
- Noble, Missouri, an unincorporated community
- Noble, Oklahoma, a city
- Noble County (disambiguation)
- Noble Township (disambiguation)

== People ==
- Noble (given name)
- Noble (surname)

== Animals ==
- Noble (horse), a British Thoroughbred
- Noble Decree, an American-bred British-trained Thoroughbred racehorse
- Noble macaw, a subspecies of Red-shouldered macaw
- Noble snipe, a small stocky wader
- Vaguely Noble, an Irish-bred Thoroughbred racehorse

== Arts, entertainment, and media ==
=== Characters ===
- Noble, the humanoid werewolf form of Savage/Noble, the only fully organic Transformer, from the Beast Machines series
- Noble (Ninjago), a character in Ninjago
- Noble Kale, a Marvel Comics character
- Donna Noble, a companion in the sci-fi series Doctor Who
- Geoff and Sylvia Noble, the parents of the companion Donna Noble, in the sci-fi series Doctor Who
- NOBLE team, a UNSC special warfare unit composed of Spartans, biochemically augmented supersoldiers that appear in Halo: Reach
- The Noble Family, a family of comic book superheroes in the series Noble Causes

=== Films ===
- Noble (film), a 2014 Irish film
- Noble Aspirations, a 2016 Chinese film
- Noble Savage (film), a 2018 Israeli drama film

=== Music ===
==== Groups and labels ====
- Noble (record label), a Japanese record label founded in 2001
- Noble Street Studios, a recording studio

==== Albums ====
- Noble (album), the debut album by Versailles

==== Songs ====
- "Noble" (song), by F3miii
- "Noble Savage", a song on the Virgin Steele album Noble Savage
- "Noble Surfer", a song from Surfin' U.S.A. by the Beach Boys

=== Other uses in arts, entertainment, and media ===
- Noble savage, a literary stock character

== Chemistry ==
- Noble gas (data page)
- Noble gas
- Noble metal

== Coins ==
- Noble (English coin), a medieval gold coin
- Noble (Manx coin), a platinum bullion coin

== Companies ==
- Noble (company), a production studio based in Los Angeles, California
- Noble Air, a defunct Turkish airline
- Noble Automotive, a British automobile manufacturer
- Noble Brothers Foundry, an ironworks manufacturer based in Rome, Georgia, United States
- Noble Corporation, a Cayman Islands company providing offshore drilling rigs and platforms
- Noble Energy, an English company engaged in the exploration for and production of petroleum and natural gas
- Noble Group, a Hong Kong–based trading firm
- Noble Systems Corporation, a privately held company which develops call center technology
- Nobleworks, a publisher of greeting cards

== Court Cases ==
- Noble v Alley
- Noble Investments Ltd v Keenan
- Noble siblings case

== Schools ==
- Noble High School (disambiguation)
- Noble Network of Charter Schools, a public charter high school in Chicago

== Ships ==
- HNLMS Van Galen (G84), a 1941 Royal Netherlands Navy World War II destroyer originally built as HMS Noble (G84)
- USS Noble, two ships

== Other uses ==
- Golden Noble, an old English cultivar of the domesticated apple
- National Organization of Black Law Enforcement Executives, or NOBLE
- Noble baronets, three titles in the Baronetage of the United Kingdom
- Noble polyhedron, a polyhedron which is isohedral and isogonal
- North of Boston Library Exchange, or NOBLE, a cooperative effort of 28 libraries

== See also ==
- Nobel (disambiguation)
- Justice Noble (disambiguation)
- Nobles (disambiguation)
