= 1845 in sports =

1845 in sports describes the year's events in world sport.

== Baseball ==
Events

- 23 September — formal organisation of the Knickerbocker Base Ball Club or New York Knickerbockers, initiated by Alexander Joy Cartwright, including adoption of twenty rules. Fourteen of the club rules are the earliest known written rules for playing baseball
- 22 October — New York Morning News publishes the first known box score for a baseball game, played at Elysian Fields, Hoboken, New Jersey in Hoboken, New Jersey

== Boxing ==
Events

- 9 September — William "Bendigo" Thompson finally returns to the ring after recovery from his serious knee injury. He fights Ben Caunt at Stony Stratford for the Championship of England and is victorious after 93 rounds when Caunt is disqualified for going down without having been struck. Caunt denies the accusation and announces his retirement, leaving Bendigo as undisputed champion.

== Cricket ==
Events

- 21 & 22 August — the present Surrey County Cricket Club is formed at a meeting which takes place at the new Kennington Oval during a match between two local teams

England

- Most runs – Fuller Pilch 569 @ 21.07 (HS 117)
- Most wickets – William Hillyer 174 @ 12.30 (BB 8–30)

== Football ==
Events

- Written version of Rugby School football rules which allow the ball to be carried and passed by hand. These rules are the earliest that are definitely known to have been written. They are a major step in the evolution of rugby league and rugby union; not to mention Australian rules football, American football, Gaelic football, etc. The Rugby School rules make a clear distinction between the "handling" game and the "dribbling" game. Dribbling is running with the ball at one's feet.
- Although Eton College rules allow the ball to be touched and controlled by hand, they do not allow running with the ball in the hand or passing of the ball by hand. So, whereas Rugby School has effectively created the first "handling game" rules, Eton could have created the earliest rules of the "dribbling game".
- Introduction of referees at Eton. Linesmen at the time are called umpires.

== Horse racing ==
England

- Grand National – Cure-All
- 1,000 Guineas Stakes – Picnic
- 2,000 Guineas Stakes – Idas
- The Derby – The Merry Monarch
- The Oaks – Refraction
- St. Leger Stakes – The Baron

== Rowing ==
The Boat Race

- 15 March — Cambridge wins the 7th Oxford and Cambridge Boat Race, a revival of the race last contested in 1842
