= 1994 in science =

The year 1994 in science and technology involved many significant events, listed below.

== Archaeology and paleontology ==
- March 31 – The journal Nature reports the finding in Ethiopia of the first complete Australopithecus afarensis skull, significant in the study of human evolution.
- December 18 – Chauvet Cave discovered by Jean-Marie Chauvet and other speleologists near Vallon-Pont-d'Arc in the Ardèche department of southern France, containing some of the earliest known cave paintings of animals, as well as other evidence of Upper Paleolithic life.
- The Australopithecus skeleton "Little Foot" is identified in South Africa.

== Astronomy and space exploration ==
- January 8 – Soyuz TM-18: Valeri Polyakov begins his 437.7-day orbit of the Earth, eventually setting the world record for days spent in orbit.
- February 3 – Asteroid (136617) 1994 CC is discovered.
- February 21 – Revealing of the first photo of Pluto and its moon Charon taken from the Hubble Space Telescope.
- July 16–22 – The fragments of Comet Shoemaker–Levy 9 impact the planet Jupiter.
- July 21 – R. Ibata, M. Irwin, and G. Gilmore discover the Sagittarius Dwarf Elliptical Galaxy, a satellite galaxy of the Milky Way, considered the closest galaxy to the Milky Way until 2003.
- October 13 (UTC) – NASA loses radio contact with the Magellan spacecraft after a successful mission as the probe descends into the thick atmosphere of Venus and is presumed to burn up in the atmosphere.
- Asteroid 7484 Dogo Onsen is discovered by Masahiro Koishikawa.
- 14032 Mego is discovered.
- 8C 1435+63 is discovered and at z=4.25 becomes the most distant known galaxy.

== Biology and medicine ==
- May 18 – The Flavr Savr, a genetically modified tomato, is deemed safe for consumption by the FDA, becoming the first commercially grown genetically engineered food to be granted a license for human consumption.
- September 10 – Wollemia (the 'Wollemi Pine'), previously known only from fossils, is discovered living in remote rainforest gorges in the Wollemi National Park of New South Wales by David Noble.
- October – First public demonstration of the Cochrane Database of Systematic Reviews.
- December 15 – Publication of the "Fukuda" clinical description of chronic fatigue syndrome.
- The Dingiso or tree-kangaroo of Western New Guinea is first seen by scientists.
- Gilbert's potoroo is rediscovered in Australia having been thought extinct.
- Flora of China begins publication.
- The first gene linked to Alzheimer's disease is discovered. No new linked genes would be found until 2009.
- The BRCA1 gene is cloned by scientists at University of Utah, National Institute of Environmental Health Sciences (NIEHS) and Myriad Genetics.
- The Western Hemisphere is declared free of polio.

== Chemistry ==
- November 9 – Darmstadtium first detected at the Gesellschaft für Schwerionenforschung (GSI) in Darmstadt, Germany, by Peter Armbruster and Gottfried Münzenberg, under the direction of Prof. Sigurd Hofmann.
- December 8 – The first three atoms of Roentgenium are observed by an international team led by Sigurd Hofmann at the GSI in Darmstadt.

== Computer science ==
- January – Jerry Yang and David Filo create "Jerry's Guide to the World Wide Web", a hierarchically organised website, while studying at Stanford University; in April it is renamed Yahoo!
- March 14
  - Apple Computer, Inc. releases the Power Macintosh, the first Macintosh computers to use the new PowerPC microprocessors.
  - The Linux kernel version 1.0.0 is released after over two years of development.
- April 12 – Husband-and-wife law partners Laurence Canter and Martha Siegel post the first massive commercial spam on Usenet in the United States.
- July 5 – Jeff Bezos launches Amazon.
- c. August – Pizza Hut becomes the first restaurant to offer online food ordering, in California.
- October 1 – The World Wide Web Consortium is founded by Tim Berners-Lee, becoming the main international standards organization for the World Wide Web.
- c. November – Online service America Online purchases Booklink as a browser to offer its users a gateway to the World Wide Web for the first time. This marks the beginning of easy accessibility of the Web to the average person in the U.S. In 1996, AOL replaces Booklink with a browser based on Internet Explorer, allegedly in exchange for inclusion of AOL in Windows.
- December 3 – Sony release the PlayStation fifth generation home video game console in Japan.
- December 15 – Netscape launch the Netscape Navigator web browser, for which it creates HTTP Secure.
- Leonard Adleman describes the experimental use of DNA as a computational system to solve a seven-node instance of the Hamiltonian path problem, the first known instance of the successful use of DNA to compute an algorithm.
- Penguin Books offer Peter James' novel Host on two floppy disks as "the world's first electronic novel".

== Earth sciences ==
- December 21 – Mexico's Popocatépetl volcano, dormant for 47 years, resumes eruption.

== Mathematics ==
- September 19 – Wiles' proof of Fermat's Last Theorem: English mathematician Andrew Wiles devises a new approach to the final proof of Fermat's Last Theorem, sending his proof to colleagues on October 6 and submitting for publication on October 24.
- The tennis ball theorem is first published under this name by Russian mathematician Vladimir Arnold.

== Molecular biology ==
- Green fluorescent protein is successfully expressed in C. elegans, starting its career as a fluorescent marker.

== Technology ==
- May 6 – The Channel Tunnel, which took 15,000 workers more than seven years to complete, officially opens between England and France; it will enable passengers to travel by rail between the two countries in 35 minutes.
- August 16 – The world's first smartphone, the IBM Simon, goes on sale.
- The first high-brightness blue LED is achieved, an invention that earns the researchers a Nobel Prize in 2014.
- QR code invented by Japanese company Denso.

== Awards ==
- Fields Prize in Mathematics: Efim Isakovich Zelmanov, Pierre-Louis Lions, Jean Bourgain and Jean-Christophe Yoccoz
- Nobel Prizes
  - Physics – Bertram N. Brockhouse, Clifford G. Shull
  - Chemistry – George A. Olah
  - Medicine – Alfred G. Gilman, Martin Rodbell
- Turing Award – Edward Feigenbaum, Raj Reddy
- Wollaston Medal for Geology – William Jason Morgan

== Deaths ==
- January 25 – Stephen Cole Kleene (b. 1909), American mathematician.
- April 17 – Roger Wolcott Sperry (b. 1913), American neuropsychologist, neurobiologist and winner of the Nobel Prize in Physiology or Medicine.
- May 12 – Erik Erikson (b. 1902), German American psychologist.
- July 29 – Dorothy Hodgkin (b. 1910), British biochemist and winner of the Nobel Prize in Chemistry.
- August 19 – Linus Pauling (b. 1901), American chemist.
- August 29 – Arthur Mourant (b. 1904), Jersiais hematologist.
- October 28 – Calvin Souther Fuller (b. 1902), American physical chemist at AT&T Bell Laboratories.
