= 1846 in sports =

1846 in sports describes the year's events in world sport.

== Baseball ==
Events

- 19 June — first match certainly played under the Knickerbocker rules at Elysian Fields in Hoboken, New Jersey.

== Boxing ==
Events

- William Thompson retains the Championships of England but there is no record of any fights involving him in 1846.

== Cricket ==
Events

- 25 & 26 May — the earliest-known first-class match at The Oval was Surrey Club v. MCC
- 25 & 26 June — the new Surrey County Cricket Club played its inaugural first-class match v. Kent County Cricket Club at The Oval, winning by 10 wickets
- Foundation of the travelling All-England Eleven (AEE) by William Clarke. Making good use of the developing railway network, the team plays its first matches at Sheffield, Manchester and Leeds.

England

- Most runs – Thomas Box 413 @ 20.65 (HS 79)
- Most wickets – William Hillyer 152 @ 6.83 (BB 7–?)

== Horse racing ==
England

- Grand National – Pioneer
- 1,000 Guineas Stakes – Mendicant
- 2,000 Guineas Stakes – Sir Tatton Sykes
- The Derby – Pyrrhus the First
- The Oaks – Mendicant
- St. Leger Stakes – Sir Tatton Sykes

== Rowing ==
The Boat Race

- 3 April — Cambridge wins the 8th Oxford and Cambridge Boat Race
