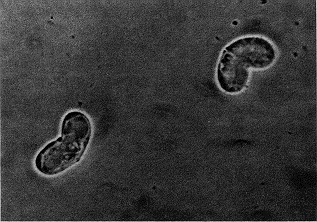
- Ceratonova shasta spores

Scientific classification
- Kingdom: Animalia
- Phylum: Cnidaria
- Class: Myxozoa
- Order: Bivalvulida
- Family: Ceratomyxidae
- Genus: Ceratonova
- Species: C. shasta

Binomial name
- Ceratonova shasta Noble, 1950

Synonyms
- Ceratomyxa shasta

= Ceratonova shasta =

Species of marine parasite

Ceratonova shasta (syn. Ceratomyxa shasta) is a myxosporean parasite that infects salmonid fish on the Pacific coast of North America. It was first observed at the Crystal Lake Hatchery, Shasta County, California, and has now been reported from Idaho, Oregon, Washington, British Columbia and Alaska.

== Life history ==
In addition to the fish host, C. shasta infects a freshwater annelid worm. Actinospores are released from the worm, and infect fish, on contact, in the water column. Neither horizontal (fish to fish), nor vertical (fish to egg) transmissions have been documented under laboratory conditions, suggesting that the worm host is necessary for completion of the life cycle.

Spores are released back into freshwater system after its fish host dies, however the complete life cycle, host and vector interaction is not fully understood (especially the ecology of the polychaete host).

Research indicates that the potential for infection is enhanced when water temperatures are high, water flow is low, or numbers of infectious C. shasta are relatively high. Infection rates appear to be higher in or below still water environments than riverine ones.

== Pathology of infection ==
Clinical indications of infection in salmons include lethargy, loss of body mass, darkening of the skin, ascites, exophthalmia and kidney pustules, These symptoms vary from one salmonid species to another, and also depend on life stage of the host.

Internally, infection with C. shasta affects entire digestive tract, liver, gall bladder, spleen, gonads, kidney, heart, gills, and muscle tissues. Infection with C. shasta in adult chinook salmon causes mortality through intestinal perforations and co-occurring bacterial infections.

Cold temperatures and salinity may reduce progress of disease, but do not eliminate infection. Progression of infection and mortality is temperature dependent, with higher temperature increasing disease progression and resulting in quicker mortality.

== Disease resistance ==
Salmonid stocks exhibit variable resistance to C. shasta. Resistance is variable and may be compromised by environmental conditions which enhance infectivity. Salmonid stocks which are resistant to C. shasta are not necessarily resistant to other myxosporean infections, such as Myxobolus cerebralis.

== Dams and proliferation ==
Dammed rivers are associated with the proliferation of C. shasta. The dams on the river Klamath resulted in the colonization of large areas with annelid worms which are a secondary host of C. shasta. Dammed areas tend to cause overcrowding of fishes which is associated with C. shasta infection. Plans for the removal of the dams on the Klamath are underway.
