= Nobles (disambiguation) =

Nobles are members of a nobility.

Nobles may also refer to:

- Noble and Greenough School, a preparatory school in Dedham, Massachusetts, United States
- Nobles County, Minnesota, United States
- Nobles, Tennessee, an unincorporated community, United States
- Nobles a series of books written for the Forgotten Realms of Dungeons & Dragons
- Nobles: The Shining Host, a book for the Changeling: The Dreaming tabletop role-playing game

== People with the surname ==
- Cliff Nobles (1941–2008), American pop singer
- Gene Nobles (1913–1989), American radio disc jockey
- Gerald Nobles (born 1971), American boxer
- Kaleb Nobles (born 1993 or 1994), American college football coach
- Melissa Nobles (born 1963), American political scientist and academic administrator
- Vada Nobles (21st century), American record producer and songwriter
- William Nobles (disambiguation)
  - William Nobles (cinematographer), American cinematographer.
  - William H. Nobles (1816-1876), American politician

== See also ==
- Noble (disambiguation)
