= Warren Noble =

Warren Noble may refer to:

- Warren P. Noble (1820–1903), U.S. Representative from Ohio
- Warren Noble (inventor) (1885–1950), British-born American automotive engineer and inventor
