= Joseph French =

Joseph French may refer to:

- Joseph Nathaniel French (1888–1975), architect
- Joseph Lewis French (1858–1936), American novelist, editor, and poet
- Joseph French (jockey), steeplechase rider who took part in the 1845 Grand National
- Joe French (born 1949), British Air Chief Marshal, Royal Air Force commander
- Joe French (footballer), English footballer
- Inspector French, a fictional detective created by Freeman Wills Crofts

== See also ==
- Joseph French Johnson (1853–1925), economist
