= William Noble =

William Noble may refer to:

- William Bonneau Noble (1780–1831), English landscape painter
- William H. Noble (1788–1850), United States Representative from New York
- William Noble (jockey) (1814–1897), English jockey
- William Henry Noble (British Army officer) (1834–1892), Anglo-Irish army officer
- William Clark Noble (1858–1938), American sculptor
- William Noble (1861 - 1943), BBC Founder, Chief Engineer, GPO
- William Noble, 1st Baron Kirkley (1863–1935), English shipowner
- William Noble (missionary) (1866–1945), American missionary in Korea

== See also ==
- Bill Noble (1884–1937), rugby league player
- William Nobles (disambiguation)
