= Ceratomyxa auratae =

Scientific classification
- Domain: Eukaryota
- Kingdom: Animalia
- Phylum: Cnidaria
- Class: Myxosporea
- Order: Bivalvulida
- Family: Ceratomyxidae
- Genus: Ceratomyxa
- Species: C. auratae

Binomial name
- Ceratomyxa auratae Rocha, Casal, Rangel, Castro, Severino, Azevedo & Santos, 2015

Species of marine parasite

Ceratomyxa auratae is a species of myxozoan parasite that infects the gall bladder of the gilthead seabream, Sparus aurata. It was discovered in an aquaculture facility in southern Portugal.
