= Ceratomyxa hooperi =

Scientific classification
- Kingdom: Animalia
- Phylum: Cnidaria
- Class: Myxosporea
- Order: Bivalvulida
- Family: Ceratomyxidae
- Genus: Ceratomyxa
- Species: C. hooperi

Binomial name
- Ceratomyxa hooperi Gunter & Adlard, 2009

Species of marine parasite

Ceratomyxa hooperi is a myxosporean parasite that infects gall-bladders of serranid fishes from the Great Barrier Reef. It was first found on Epinephelus quoyanus.
