= Ceratomyxa elegans =

Scientific classification
- Kingdom: Animalia
- Phylum: Cnidaria
- Class: Myxosporea
- Order: Bivalvulida
- Family: Ceratomyxidae
- Genus: Ceratomyxa
- Species: C. elegans

Binomial name
- Ceratomyxa elegans Jameson, 1929

Species of marine parasite

Ceratomyxa elegans is a species of myxozoans. It is found in the Mediterranean and the Argentinian Seas. It is a parasite of Batrachoidiform toadfishes.
