= 1846 Grand National =

English steeplechase horse race

- Grand National
- Location: Aintree
- Date: 4 March 1846
- Winning horse: Pioneer
- Starting price: 200/10
- Jockey: William Taylor
- Owner: Mr. Adams
- Conditions: Good (good to firm in places)

The 1846 Grand Liverpool Steeplechase, later to become known as the Grand National Steeplechase, was the eighth official annual running of a handicap steeplechase. It took place at Aintree Racecourse near Liverpool on 4 March 1846 and attracted a then-record field of 22 entrants. It was won by the unconsidered outsider Pioneer.

Veluti, ridden by Jem Mason, a rider who had previously won the race in 1839 was sent off as the 11/2 favourite to win while the top weight of 12 stone 8 lbs was given to Firefly, the mount of Larry Byrne.

== The course ==
Start – Moved from last year to an unused part of Seed's Farm beyond the lane on the northern part of the course. Fence 1 [16 on the second circuit] Bank topped with thorn gorse and timber with deep ditch on the take off side. Fence 2 [17] Bank topped with thorn gorse and timber with deep ditch on the take off side. Fence 3 [18] Bank topped with thorn gorse and timber with deep ditch on the take off side. Fence 4 [19] Strong range of post and rails with a drop over an ugly drain. Fence 5 [20] Quick set hedge with a small running stream. Fence 6 [21] Broken hedge with a wide bank and ditch Fence 7 [22] Hunting fence entering Mr Bailey's stubble land. Fence 8 [23] Double of post and rails, drain and thick thorn with sharp left turn Fence 9 [24] Hedge and brook. Fence 10 [25] Bank, ditch and low stumped hedge Fence 11 [26] Mr Hill's fence. Fence 12 [27] Fence into the Canal lane. Fence 13 Artificial thorn and railings at the distance chair Fence 14 Artificial leap with three yards of water Fence 15 A Banked Fence out of the lane. Fence 28 Brushed Hurdle. Fence 29 Brushed Hurdle. Fence 30 A Brushed Hurdle.

After jumping fence 12, the runners turned left towards the grandstand but on the second circuit would continue wider before turning to line up for the three hurdles instead of the artificial fences taken on the first circuit.

== Finishing order ==
Only the first three past the post were officially recorded. There are nine known detailed independent contemporary reports of the race in the British and Irish press and these often contradict each other. The finishing order below is based on the most likely outcome where multiple reports concur.

The starting prices are taken from Bell's Life for those that were quoted. The winner was not quoted on the course or in Bell's Life but 200/10 {20/1} was taken by the owner the night before the race. Unquoted runners would often have been listed by a bookmaker under the title 'Any price these others' Anyone wishing to back any of these runners could simply name their price and if the Bookmaker could then decide if they were willing to risk the bet or not.

Switcher's price dropped from 25/1 to 7/1 in the minutes before the race after running well to finish third in the race prior to the National.

Position	Name	Rider	Age	Weight	Starting Price	Distance or Fate	Colours
Winner	Pioneer	William Taylor	6	11-12	200/10	10 mins, 46 secs	White with black cap
Second	Culverthorpe	Harry Rackley		11-12	12/1	Three lengths	Red with white cap
Third	Switcher	Denny Wynne	5	12-04	7/1	Three lengths	White
Fourth	Firefly	Larry Byrne	7	12-04	7/1	A short head	Light blue, black cap
Fifth	Eagle	Captain William Peel	5	11-12	6/1	A distance	Primrose, purple cap
Sixth*	Cure-All	William Loft	8	12-04	16/1	May not have completed the course	Primrose, black cap
Seventh*	Peter Simple	John Frisby	12	11-10	100/6	May not have completed the course	Crimson, black cap
Eighth*	Carlow	Tom Olliver		11-04	8/1 taken	Tailed off and distanced	Blue and white stripes, black cap
Ninth	Major A	W Blake	6	10-06	25/1	Tailed off and distanced	Royal blue, yellow sleeves and cap
Non finishers
Fence twenty-nine {Second Brushed Hurdle}	Veluti	Jem Mason	6	11-08	11/2 favourite	Broke down, pulled up	White, black cap
Fence Twenty-seven {Canal Bridge}	Perambulator	Neptune Stagg	6	10-08	16/1	Broke down and Pulled up, had earlier almost fell at the Chair and nearly bolted at the sunken lane	Purple, orange cap
Fence Twenty-seven {Canal Bridge)	Brenda	Horatio Powell	9	11-04	100/6	Pulled Up, Tailed off	Black
Fence Twenty-seven {Canal Bridge)	Regalia	Thomas Doolan		11-12	Not quoted	Pulled Up, tailed off	Blue, black cap
Fence Twenty-six	Mameluke	Allen McDonough		10-12	10/1	Hampered fence four, Pulled Up	Blue, white sleeves, black cap
Fence 15 [Sunken lane]	Golden Pippin	Charles Nainby	7	11-12	12/1	Ran out when leading and fell, remounted but tailed off and soon pulled up	Blue, black cap
Fence 15 Sunken Lane	Pickwick	James Daly	6	10-10	Not quoted	Fell Canal side, remounted but tailed off with broken leather and pulled up	Blue and white stripes, black cap
Fence 12 [Canal Bridge]	Lancet	William McDonough	5	11-00	10/1	Brought down by a mounted spectator	Blue and white stripes, black cap
Fence 11 [Mr Hill's fence]	Tinderbox	C Daly		11-04	Not quoted	Fell	Red tartan, black cap
Fence 10 [Bank, ditch and hedge]	Troubadour	Gibbon B Rammell	14	11-06	25/1	Fell	Blue and white stripes, black cap
Fence Four [Bank, thorn and timber]	Hornihiharriho	J Parker		11-00	Not quoted	Brought Down	Light blue, black cap
Fence Three [Bank, thorn and timber]	The Scavenger	James Bradley	6	10-02	Not quoted	Refused 1st, tried to refuse 2nd, refused again	Black
Fence One [Bank, thorn and timber]	Lady Grey	E Thomas	6	10-00	Not quoted	Fell	Pink, black cap

== The race ==
Some later histories have suggested the course was incorrectly flagged, but this is not supported by contemporary reports and descriptions of the course.

Peter Simple led for the majority of the first circuit. Lady Gray Fell at the first jump evaded her rider's attempt to remount while The Scavenger refused. He tried to refuse the second jump as well before finally getting his way at the third, proving equally difficult to return to the stables. Pickwick's rider lost a stirrup at the second fence and was quickly tailed off while Mameluke and Hornihihharriho collided at the fence before Becher's Brook. The former recovered while the latter was baulked and brought down by another passing horse, with jockey, taking several kicks, one of which left him with a heavy facial wound. Lancet's rider, William McDonough, was knocked from his horse by a mounted spectator as the field were turning to enter the race course proper and was badly bruised, Troubadour fell at a fence along the Canal side and Tinderbox was unable to negotiate the Table top jump at the Anchor Bridge crossing.

Perambulator led the field on the racecourse, having completely overpowered his rider, who did well to stay on board when the pair nearly parted company at the fence in front of the stands. However, they still held a lead of many lengths over the Water jump, ahead of Veluti, Golden Pippin, Peter Simple, Major A, Switcher, Carlow and Culverthorpe, accompanied by the riderless Lady Gray and Lancet. Having battled through the first circuit, a long way off the pace, Pickwick's rider decided That continuing was futile and pulled up without going out for another round.

Golden Pippin took up the running, heading away from the stands, only to bolt off the course, down Seed's Lane, where he collided with a cart and fell. Both Perambulator and Veluti attempted to follow suit, the former being kept on course by other horses while the latter was expertly kept on track by Jem Mason. However, both lost ground to the new leader Peter Simple, who was passed by Cure-All approaching Becher's Brook for the second time, where Culverthorpe made a bid to win the race, opening up a good lead over Switcher, Veluti, Peter Simple and Eagle with Brenda and Mameluke both briefly coming into contention before fading.

As the runners approached the racecourse, Culverthorpe still led from Veluti with Pioneer moving through tiring horses to take third. Peter Simple and Cure-All were among those to realise they were beaten at this stage while Veluti was unfortunate to break down after jumping the third last hurdle. As Pioneer drew up alongside Culverthorpe many of the Irish contingent in the stands began cheering, believing that his white silks were instead the similar colours of Switcher instead. However most realised by the time Pioneer passed the post in front that it was the unconsidered outsider who had been victorious, Culverthorpe held off Switcher, Eagle and Firefly for the minor placings. The majority of the remainder passing the post most likely pulled up before the hurdles.

Although an unconsidered outsider, Pioneer was quoted at a price of 200/10 the evening before the race although few, if any bets, other than his owner, were known to have been struck and few bookmakers offered a price. He proved himself to be a very good horse by winning a prestigious race at Leamington Spa the following week. His rider, William Taylor was a twenty-seven-year-old vet and was one of nine riders making their Grand National debut, which also included future winning rider, Denny Wynne.

Tom Olliver was the only rider in the race to have taken part in all seven previous runnings of the Grand Liverpool, while Horatio Powell was also taking part in the main race of the meeting for the eighth time, having run in one of the three unofficial precursors.
