= David Noble =

David Noble may refer to:

- David A. Noble (1802–1876), U.S. Representative from Michigan
- David F. Noble (1945–2010), historian of technology
- David L. Noble, engineer at IBM who invented the floppy disk
- David W. Noble (1925–2018), historiographer and historian of thought
- David Noble (Australian footballer) (born 1967), former coach of North Melbourne and former Fitzroy AFL player
- David Noble (canyoner) (born 1965), canyoner and discoverer of the Wollemi Pine
- David Noble (footballer, born 1982), football player for St. Albans City F.C.
- Dave Noble (1900–1983), American football running back
