= Noble (given name) =

Noble is the given name of the following people:

- Noble David Cook (1941–2024), author and historian of colonial Peru
- Noble Craig (died 2018), American actor and Vietnam War veteran
- Noble Doss (1920–2009), American National Football League halfback
- Noble S. Elderkin (1810–1875), American politician
- Noble Jones Gregory (1897–1971), American politician
- Noble Foster Hoggson (1865–?), American builder, architect and author
- Noble A. Hull (1827–1907), American politician
- Noble Johnson (1881–1978), African-American actor and film producer
- Noble J. Johnson (1887–1968), American politician and judge
- Noble Jones (1702–1775), one of the first settlers of the Province of Georgia and one of its leading officials
- Noble Wimberly Jones (c. 1723–1805), American physician and statesman, son of the above
- Noble Jorgensen (1925–1982), American basketball player
- Noble Kizer (1900–1940), American football and basketball player, football coach and college athletics administrator
- Noble L. Mitchell (1854–1932), American politician and lawyer
- Noble Bennet Pickett (1801–1884), American physician
- Noble C. Powell (1891–1968), American Episcopal bishop
- Noble Sissle (1889–1975), American jazz composer, lyricist, bandleader, singer and playwright
- Noble Threewitt (1911–2010), American Thoroughbred racehorse trainer
- Noble Villeneuve (1938–2018), Canadian politician
- Noble "Thin Man" Watts (1926–2004), American blues, jump blues and rhythm-and-blues saxophonist
- Noble Willingham (1931–2004), American actor
