= Araucarioides =

Araucarioides Temporal range: Campanian–Eocene

Scientific classification
- Kingdom: Plantae
- Clade: Tracheophytes
- Clade: Gymnospermae
- Division: Pinophyta
- Class: Pinopsida
- Order: Araucariales
- Family: Araucariaceae
- Genus: †Araucarioides; Bigwood and Hill, 1985

Type species
- †Araucarioides linearis Bigwood and Hill, 1985

Other species
- Araucarioides falcata Pole, 1995

Extinct genus of conifer

Araucarioides is an extinct genus of conifer belonging to the family Araucariaceae. The type species Araucarioides linearis is known from the Early Eocene of Tasmania, with fossils including isolated leaves (which typify the genus), parts of the conifer cone, as well as possible seeds, associated with Dilwynites tuberculatus pollen. Another species only known from leaves, Araucarioides falcata is known from the Late Cretaceous (Campanian) of New Zealand. Phylogenetic analysis suggests that Araucarioides linearis is closely related to both Agathis and Wollemia rather than to Araucaria.
