= Ceratomyxa =

Scientific classification
- Kingdom: Animalia
- Phylum: Cnidaria
- Class: Myxozoa
- Order: Bivalvulida
- Family: Ceratomyxidae
- Genus: Ceratomyxa; Thelohan, 1892

Species
- See text

Synonyms
- Leptotheca Thélohan, 1895

Genus of marine parasites

Ceratomyxa is a genus of myxozoan.

== Species ==
The following species are recognized:

- Ceratomyxa abbreviata (Davis, 1917)
- Ceratomyxa acanthopagri (Zhao & Song, 2003)
- Ceratomyxa acanthuri Kpatcha, Diebakate, Faye & Toguebaye, 1996
- Ceratomyxa adeli (Bakay & Grudnev, 1998)
- Ceratomyxa aggregata Davis, 1917
- Ceratomyxa agilis Thélohan, 1892
- Ceratomyxa allantoidea Gaevskaya & Kovaljova, 1984
- Ceratomyxa amatea (Aseeva, 2001)
- Ceratomyxa ammodytis Zhao & Song, 2003
- Ceratomyxa ampla (Kovaljova, Rodjuk & Grudnev, 2002)
- Ceratomyxa anguillae Tuzet & Ormieres, 1957
- Ceratomyxa angusta Meglitsch, 1960
- Ceratomyxa annulata (Meglitsch, 1960)
- Ceratomyxa antarctica Kovaljova, Rodjuk & Grudney, 2002
- Ceratomyxa apogoni (Narasimhamurti, Kalavati, Anuradha & Padma Dorothy, 1990)
- Ceratomyxa appendiculata Thélohan, 1892
- Ceratomyxa arcuata Thelohan, 1895
- Ceratomyxa artedielli Polyanskii, 1955
- Ceratomyxa aspera Aseeva, 2003
- Ceratomyxa auerbachi Kabata, 1962
- Ceratomyxa auratae Rocha, Casal, Rangel, Castro, Severino, Azevedo & Santos, 2015
- Ceratomyxa azonusi Aseeva, 2003
- Ceratomyxa beloneae Lubat, Radujkovic, Marques & Bouix, 1989
- Ceratomyxa beveridgei (Moser, Kent & Dennis, 1989)
- Ceratomyxa brayi Gunter & Adlard, 2009
- Ceratomyxa bryanti Gunter & Adlard, 2008
- Ceratomyxa burgerae Gunter & Adlard, 2008
- Ceratomyxa capricornensis Gunter & Adlard, 2008
- Ceratomyxa castigata Meglitsch, 1960
- Ceratomyxa castigatoides Meglitsch, 1960
- Ceratomyxa centriscopsi Gunter & Adlard, 2010
- Ceratomyxa chromis Lubat, Radujkovic, Marques & Bouix, 1989
- Ceratomyxa coelorhyncha (Yoshino & Noble, 1973)
- Ceratomyxa constricta Meglitsch, 1960
- Ceratomyxa coris Georgévitch, 1916
- Ceratomyxa cottoidii Reed, Basson, Van As & Dykova, 2007
- Ceratomyxa cribbi Gunter & Adlard, 2008
- Ceratomyxa cutmorei Gunter & Adlard, 2009
- Ceratomyxa declivis Meglitsch, 1960
- Ceratomyxa dehoopi Reed, Basson, Van As & Dykova, 2007
- Ceratomyxa dennisi Gunter & Adlard, 2008
- Ceratomyxa diplodae Lubat, Radujkovic, Marques & Bouix, 1989
- Ceratomyxa drepanopsettae Averintzev, 1908
- Ceratomyxa dubia Dunkerley, 1921
- Ceratomyxa durusa Aseeva, 2003
- Ceratomyxa elegans Jameson, 1929
- Ceratomyxa ellipsoidea Kovaljova, Rodjuk & Grudney, 2002
- Ceratomyxa elongata Meglitsch, 1960
- Ceratomyxa etrumuci (Dogiel, 1948)
- Ceratomyxa faba Meglitsch, 1960
- Ceratomyxa falcatus Gunter & Adlard, 2008
- Ceratomyxa fialai Cantatore & Lisnerová, 2025
- Ceratomyxa fisheri Jameson, 1929
- Ceratomyxa flexa Meglitsch, 1960
- Ceratomyxa fujitai Gunter & Adlard, 2010
- Ceratomyxa galeata Jameson, 1929
- Ceratomyxa gemmaphora Meglitsch, 1960
- Ceratomyxa ghaffari Ali, Abdel-Baki & Sakran, 2006
- Ceratomyxa gibba Meglitsch, 1960
- Ceratomyxa gleesoni Gunter & Adlard, 2009
- Ceratomyxa globulifera Thélohan, 1895
- Ceratomyxa hama Meglitsch, 1960
- Ceratomyxa hepseti (Thélohan, 1895)
- Ceratomyxa herouardi Georgévitch, 1916
- Ceratomyxa hokarari Meglitsch, 1960
- Ceratomyxa honckenii Reed, Basson, Van As & Dykova, 2007
- Ceratomyxa hooperi Gunter & Adlard, 2009
- Ceratomyxa hopkinsi Jameson, 1929
- Ceratomyxa huanghaiensis Zhao & Song, 2003
- Ceratomyxa hungarica Molnar, 1992
- Ceratomyxa inaequalis Doflein, 1898
- Ceratomyxa inconstans Jameson, 1929
- Ceratomyxa informis (Auerbach, 1910)
- Ceratomyxa insolita Meglitsch, 1960
- Ceratomyxa intexua Meglitsch, 1960
- Ceratomyxa inversa Meglitsch, 1960
- Ceratomyxa kenti Gunter & Adlard, 2008
- Ceratomyxa kovaljovae (Bakay & Grudnev, 1998)
- Ceratomyxa labracis Sitjá-Bobadilla & Alvarez-Pellitero, 1993
- Ceratomyxa lata Dunkerley, 1921
- Ceratomyxa lateolabracis Zhao & Song, 2003
- Ceratomyxa latesi (Chakravarty, 1943)
- Ceratomyxa laxa Meglitsch, 1960
- Ceratomyxa lepidopusi Gunter & Adlard, 2010
- Ceratomyxa lianoides Aseeva, 2003
- Ceratomyxa limandae Fujita, 1923
- Ceratomyxa linospora Doflein, 1898
- Ceratomyxa longipes (Auerbach, 1910)
- Ceratomyxa longispina Petruschewsky, 1932
- Ceratomyxa lovei Gunter & Adlard, 2010
- Ceratomyxa lubati Gunter & Adlard, 2010
- Ceratomyxa lunula Gunter & Adlard, 2008
- Ceratomyxa macroformis (Gaevskaya & Kovaljova, 1984)
- Ceratomyxa macronesi (Chakravarty, 1943)
- Ceratomyxa macrospora (Auerbach, 1909)
- Ceratomyxa macrouridonum Gunter & Adlard, 2010
- Ceratomyxa maenae Georgévitch, 1929
- Ceratomyxa markewitchi Iskov & Karataev, 1984
- Ceratomyxa maxima Gaevskaya & Kovaljova, 1980
- Ceratomyxa merlangi Zaika, 1966
- Ceratomyxa minima (Meglitsch, 1960)
- Ceratomyxa minuta Meglitsch, 1960
- Ceratomyxa moenei Meglitsch, 1960
- Ceratomyxa moseri Gunter & Adlard, 2008
- Ceratomyxa mylionis (Ishizaki, 1960)
- Ceratomyxa myxocephala Aseeva, 2002
- Ceratomyxa nebulifera (Zhao & Song, 2003)
- Ceratomyxa nitida Meglitsch, 1960
- Ceratomyxa noblei Gunter & Adlard, 2010
- Ceratomyxa nolani Gunter & Adlard, 2009
- Ceratomyxa nototheniae Kovaljova, Rodjuk & Grudney, 2002
- Ceratomyxa opisthocornata (Evdokimova, 1977)
- Ceratomyxa orientalis (Dogiel, 1948)
- Ceratomyxa orthospora Kovaljova, Rodjuk & Grudney, 2002
- Ceratomyxa ovalis (Kovaljova & Gaevskaya, 1983)
- Ceratomyxa pallida Thélohan, 1895
- Ceratomyxa parva (Thélohan, 1895)
- Ceratomyxa peculiaria Yurakhno, 1991
- Ceratomyxa pegusae Kpatcha, Diebakate & Toguebaye, 1996
- Ceratomyxa physiculusi Gunter & Adlard, 2010
- Ceratomyxa pinguis (Meglitsch, 1960)
- Ceratomyxa platichthys (Fujita, 1923)
- Ceratomyxa polymorpha Meglitsch, 1960
- Ceratomyxa priacanthi Kalavati, Dorothy & Pandian, 2002
- Ceratomyxa quadritaenia (Kovaljova & Zubchenko, 1984)
- Ceratomyxa quingdaoensis Zhao & Song, 2003
- Ceratomyxa ramosa Averintzev, 1908
- Ceratomyxa rara Kovaljova, Gaevskaya & Krasin, 1986
- Ceratomyxa recta Meglitsch, 1960
- Ceratomyxa renalis Meglitsch, 1960
- Ceratomyxa reticulata Thélohan, 1895
- Ceratomyxa scissura (Davis, 1917)
- Ceratomyxa scorpaenarum Labbé, 1899
- Ceratomyxa sebastici (Zhao & Song, 2003)
- Ceratomyxa sewelli Gunter & Adlard, 2008
- Ceratomyxa sparusaurati Sitjá-Bobadilla Palenzuela & Alvarez-Pellitero, 1995
- Ceratomyxa sphaerulosa Thélohan, 1892
- Ceratomyxa subelegans (Laird, 1953)
- Ceratomyxa subtilis Meglitsch, 1960
- Ceratomyxa talboti Gunter & Adlard, 2008
- Ceratomyxa tenuispora Kabata, 1960
- Ceratomyxa thrissoclesi Padma Dorothy, Kalavati & Vaidchi, 1998
- Ceratomyxa thunni Mladineo & Bocina, 2006
- Ceratomyxa torquata Meglitsch, 1960
- Ceratomyxa trichiuri Kpatcha, Diebakate, Faye & Toguebaye, 1996
- Ceratomyxa truncata Thélohan, 1895
- Ceratomyxa uncinata Meglitsch, 1960
- Ceratomyxa vepallida Meglitsch, 1960
- Ceratomyxa vikrami (Tripathi, 1948)
- Ceratomyxa whippsi Gunter & Adlard, 2009
- Ceratomyxa yokoyamai Gunter & Adlard, 2009

The following species has been proposed, but not recognized by WoRMS as of 2025.

- Ceratomyxa evdokimovae
