= Justice Noble =

Justice Noble may refer to:

- Mary C. Noble (born 1949), deputy chief justice of the Kentucky Supreme Court
- Merrill E. Noble (1896–1969), associate justice of the New Mexico Supreme Court

== See also ==
- Noble Justice, 2002 album by American rapper Young Noble
