= Nobel =

Nobel often refers to:

- Nobel Prize, awarded annually since 1901, from the bequest of Swedish inventor Alfred Nobel
- The Nobel family, a prominent Swedish and Russian family; see there for the list of people with the surname

Nobel may also refer to:

== Places ==
- Nobel (crater), a crater on the far side of the Moon.
- Nobel, Ontario, a village located in Ontario, Canada.
- Nobel Square, public square in Cape Town, South Africa
- Nobel Lake, Ukraine
- Nobel, Rivne Oblast, village in Ukraine

== Other uses ==
- 6032 Nobel, a main-belt asteroid
- Nobel (Australia), chemical company
- Nobel (automobile) a licence-built version of the German Fuldamobil, manufactured in the UK and Chile
- Nobel (TV series), a Norwegian television series about the country's military involvement in Afghanistan
- Nobel (typeface), a geometric, sans-serif typeface.
- The Nobel School, a secondary school in Stevenage, England.
- Nobel (crater), Moon
- Nobel Vega, Cuban actor

== See also ==
- Nobel Peace Prize
- Noble (disambiguation)
