= Ellipsomyxa =

Scientific classification
- Kingdom: Animalia
- Phylum: Cnidaria
- Class: Myxozoa
- Order: Bivalvulida
- Family: Ceratomyxidae
- Genus: Ellipsomyxa; Køie, 2003

Species
- Ellipsomyxa gobii Køie, 2003 (type); Ellipsomyxa syngnathi Køie & Karlsbakk, 2009; Ellipsomyxa fusiformis Davis, 1917; Ellipsomyxa manilensis Heiniger & Adlard, 2014; Ellipsomyxa apogoni Heiniger & Adlard, 2014; Ellipsomyxa adlardi Whipps & Font, 2013; Ellipsomyxa arothroni Heiniger & Adlard, 2014; Ellipsomyxa mugilis Sitjà-Bobadilla & Alvarez-Pellitero, 1993; Ellipsomyxa gobioides Azevedo, Videira, Casal, Matos, Oliveira, Al-Quraishy & Matos, 2013; Ellipsomyxa kalthoumi Thabet, Tlig-Zouari, Al Omar & Mansour, 2016; Ellipsomyxa nigropunctatis Heiniger & Adlard, 2014; Ellipsomyxa arariensis Da Silva, Matos, Lima, Furtado, Hamoy & Matos, 2018; Ellipsomyxa amazonensis Zatti, Atkinson, Maia, Correa, Bartholomew & Adriano, 2018

Genus of freshwater fish parasite

Ellipsomyxa is a genus of cnidarian that is part of the family Ceratomyxidae.
