= Ceratonova =

Scientific classification
- Kingdom: Animalia
- Phylum: Cnidaria
- Class: Myxosporea
- Order: Bivalvulida
- Family: Ceratomyxidae
- Genus: Ceratonova; Atkinson, Foott & Bartholomew, 2014

Genus of marine parasites

Ceratonova is a genus of myxozoan in the family Ceratomyxidae.

== Species ==
The following species are recognized in the genus Ceratonova:

- Ceratonova gasterostea Atkinson, Foott & Bartholomew, 2014
- Ceratonova shasta (Noble, 1950)
