= Noble Investments Ltd v Keenan =

Noble Investments v Keenan
- Court: Court of Appeal of New Zealand
- Full case name: NOBLE INVESTMENTS LIMITED Appellant v MAURICE RAYMOND KEENAN, JAYANTHA KALAHE KEENAN AND WARWICK JOHN AINGER
- Decided: 16 March 2005
- Transcript: Court of Appeal judgment

Court membership
- Judges sitting: Anderson P, McGrath and Glazebrook JJ

Noble Investments v Keenan is a cited case in New Zealand regarding the awarding of damages under the Contractual Remedies Act where a contract has been cancelled.
