= William Loft =

British jockey

William Loft (born Seaford, Sussex 14 September 1803 – died Grimsby 15 December 1887) was a farmer and one time steeplechase rider best remembered for his victory in the 1845 Grand National riding Cure-All.

In 1843 Loft purchased the horse Cure-All at Horncastle fair and after running impressively at Lincoln he was approached by William Stuart Stirling-Crawfurd with an offer to lease the horse to run as his nominee in the forthcoming 1845 Grand National. Loft agreed on condition that he be allowed to ride the horse himself.

Loft was the second son of the Grimsby M.P. John Henry Loft and farmed on the estate inherited by his brother from his father.
