= Noble Brothers Foundry =

Coordinates: 34.2516°N 85.1757°W

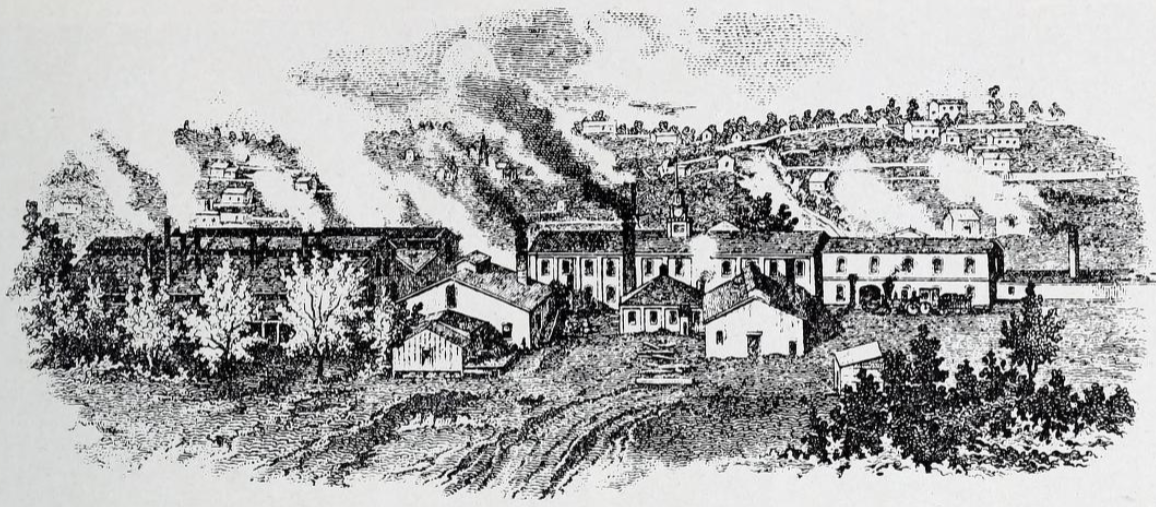
A 1922 illustration of the foundry

The Noble Brothers Foundry was a large ironworks manufacturer based in Rome, Georgia, United States. Its products included steamboat engines, furnaces, locomotives, and firearms (notably cannons) before, during and after the American Civil War. The remains of the facility can still be seen today.

== History ==
The Noble Brothers Foundry was built by James Noble Sr. and his six sons (William, James Jr., Stephen, George, Samuel and John) around 1855 in Rome, Georgia. The brothers ordered a lathe from Pennsylvania around the same time. This massive lathe was brought by boat to Mobile, Alabama. From there it was transported by a river boat up the Coosa River to the first waterfall. Here the lathe was unpacked and hauled by horse and cart to the foundry at First and Broad Street.

The foundry manufactured steam boat engines, furnaces, and locomotives. In 1857, the foundry produced the first locomotive for the Rome Railroad, making this the first locomotive to be manufactured below Richmond. In 1861 the production of the foundry took on another role. The Confederate Government ordered the foundry to produce cannons and other war materials. A rifle plant was built by the brothers, but burned down before production got started. Jefferson Davis exempted the brothers from battlefield fighting. He proclaimed "... the 6 Noble brothers are exempt from the fighting as we have plenty of men to fight but few that can make cannons."

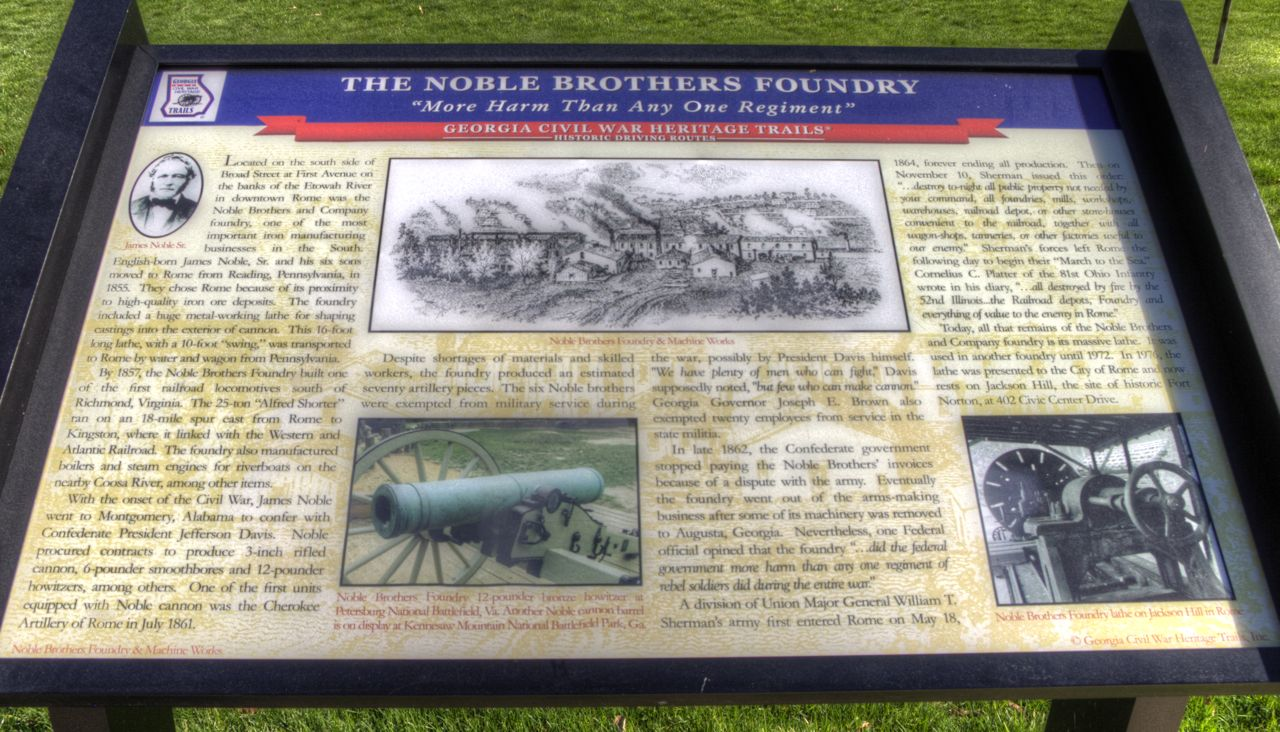
Historical marker for the Noble Brothers Foundry (2014)

A Noble Brothers Foundry 954 lb (433 kg) cannon that was made around 1861 is on display outdoors in Naperville, Illinois. To see the cannon, head to Central Park off Benton Street any time of the year.

Even though the foundry's production of cannon had been halted by the Confederate government due to an investigation into improper manufacture of weapons at the facility, they continued output of other war-related materials, especially locomotives, attracted the attention of the Union army and was a prime factor in the occupation of Rome by Sherman's troops in 1864.

On their way out of town at the end of the occupation, Sherman's troops burned the foundry facility to the ground, and attempted to dismantle the lathe using sledgehammers, with little success. The hammers marks are still visible today and the fire caused minimum damage to the lathe. The massive machine stayed in production until the mid-1960s.

The Noble Brothers played a major role in rebuilding Rome after the American Civil War. They played key roles in the production of Rome's Clock Tower.
