= Noble gas (data page) =

Supplementary information on noble gases

This page provides supplementary data about the noble gases, which were excluded from the main article to conserve space and preserve focus. Oganesson is mostly not included due to the limited amount of known data.

== Physical properties ==
=== Solid ===
Physical property	Helium	Neon	Argon	Krypton	Xenon	Radon
Density, solid at triple point (g/dm³)	–	1444	1623	2826	3540	–
Crystal structure	hcp	fcc	fcc	fcc	fcc	fcc

=== Liquid ===
Physical property	Helium	Neon	Argon	Krypton	Xenon	Radon
Density, liquid at boiling point and 1 atm (g/dm³)	125.0	1207	1393.9	2415	3057	4400
Density, liquid at triple point (g/dm³)	–	1247	1415	2451	3084	–
Thermal conductivity, liquid at boiling point (mW m^{−1} K^{−1})	31.4	129.7	121.3	88.3	73.2	–
Dielectric constant (liquid)	1.057	1.191	1.325	1.664	1.880	—

=== Gas ===
Physical property	Helium	Neon	Argon	Krypton	Xenon	Radon
Density, gas at 0 °C and 1 atm (g/dm³)	0.1786	0.9002	1.7818	3.708	5.851	9.97
Thermal conductivity at 0 °C (J s^{−1} m^{−1} K^{−1})	0.1418	0.0461	0.0169	0.00874	0.00506	0.0036
Mean free path at STP (nm)	192.66	135.36	68.33	52.34	37.88	–
Solubility in water at 20 °C (cm^{3}/kg)	8.61	10.5	33.6	59.4	108.1	230
Magnetic susceptibility (cgs units per mole)	−0.0000019	−0.0000072	−0.0000194	−0.000028	−0.000043	–
Heat capacity, C_{p}, gas at 1 atm (J mol^{−1} K^{−1})	20.78	20.79	20.85	20.95	21.01	21
Sonic velocity at 0 °C and 1 atm (m/s)	973	433	307.8	213	168	–
Thermal conductivity, gas at 0 °C and 1 atm (mW m^{−1} K^{−1})	141.84	46.07	16.94	8.74	5.06	3.6
Molar refraction (D line, cm^{3})	0.521	1.004	4.203	6.397	10.435	–
Dielectric constant (gas)	1.0000684	1.00013	1.000516	–	–	–
van der Waals constant a (L^{2}bar/mol^{2})	0.03412	0.2107	1.345	2.318	4.194	–
van der Waals constant b (L/mol)	0.02370	0.01709	0.03219	0.03978	0.05105	–

=== Phase changes and critical properties ===
Physical property	Helium	Neon	Argon	Krypton	Xenon	Radon
Boiling point (°C)	−268.8	−245.9	−185.8	−151.7	−106.6	−61.7
Boiling point (K)	4.15	27.15	87.15	121.2	165.2	211.3
Melting point (°C)	−272	−248.5	−189.6	−157.4	−111.5	−71.0
Melting point (K)	1.15	24.65	83.55	115.75	161.65	202.15
Critical temperature (K)	5.25	44.5	150.85	209.35	289.74	378.15
Critical pressure (atm)	2.26	26.9	48.3	54.3	57.64	62
Critical density (g/mL)	0.0693	0.484	0.536	0.908	1.100	–
Triple point temperature (K)	2.19	24.562	83.80	115.76	161.37	202
Triple point pressure (kPa)	5.1	43.37	68.90	73.15	81.66	70

== Atomic properties ==
Atomic property	Helium	Neon	Argon	Krypton	Xenon	Radon	Oganesson
Atomic number	2	10	18	36	54	86	118
Standard atomic weight	4.002602(2)	20.1797(6)	39.948(1)	83.80(1)	131.29(2)	(222)	(294)
Number of natural isotopes	2	3	3	6	9	4	0
Outer shell electron configuration	1s^{2}	2s^{2}2p^{6}	3s^{2}3p^{6}	4s^{2}4p^{6}	5s^{2}5p^{6}	6s^{2}6p^{6}	7s^{2}7p^{6}
Atomic radius (pm)	31	38	71	88	108	120	138
Ionization energy (kJ/mol)	2372	2080	1520	1351	1170	1037	839
Static polarizability (Å^{3})	0.204	0.392	1.63	2.465	4.01	–	–
Average Valence Electron Energy (AVEE)	4.16	4.79	3.24	2.97	2.58	2.60	–

== Abundance ==
Abundance	Helium	Neon	Argon	Krypton	Xenon	Radon	Oganesson
Solar System (for each atom of silicon)	2343	2.148	0.1025	5.515 × 10^{−5}	5.391 × 10^{−6}	–	–
Earth's atmosphere (volume fraction in ppm)	5.20	18.20	9340.00	1.10	0.09	(0.06–18) × 10^{−19}	0
Igneous rock (mass fraction in ppm)	3 × 10^{−3}	7 × 10^{−5}	4 × 10^{−2}	–	–	1.7 × 10^{−10}	0

== Economic data ==
Gas	2004 price (USD/m^{3})
Helium (industrial grade)	4.20–4.90
Helium (laboratory grade)	22.300–44.90
Argon	2.70–8.50
Neon	60–120
Krypton	400–500
Xenon	4000–5000

Radon is available only in very small quantities, and due to its short half-life, is generally produced by a radium-226 source in secular equilibrium. Oganesson is almost impossible to produce and with a very short half-life, it is not readily available for purchase.
