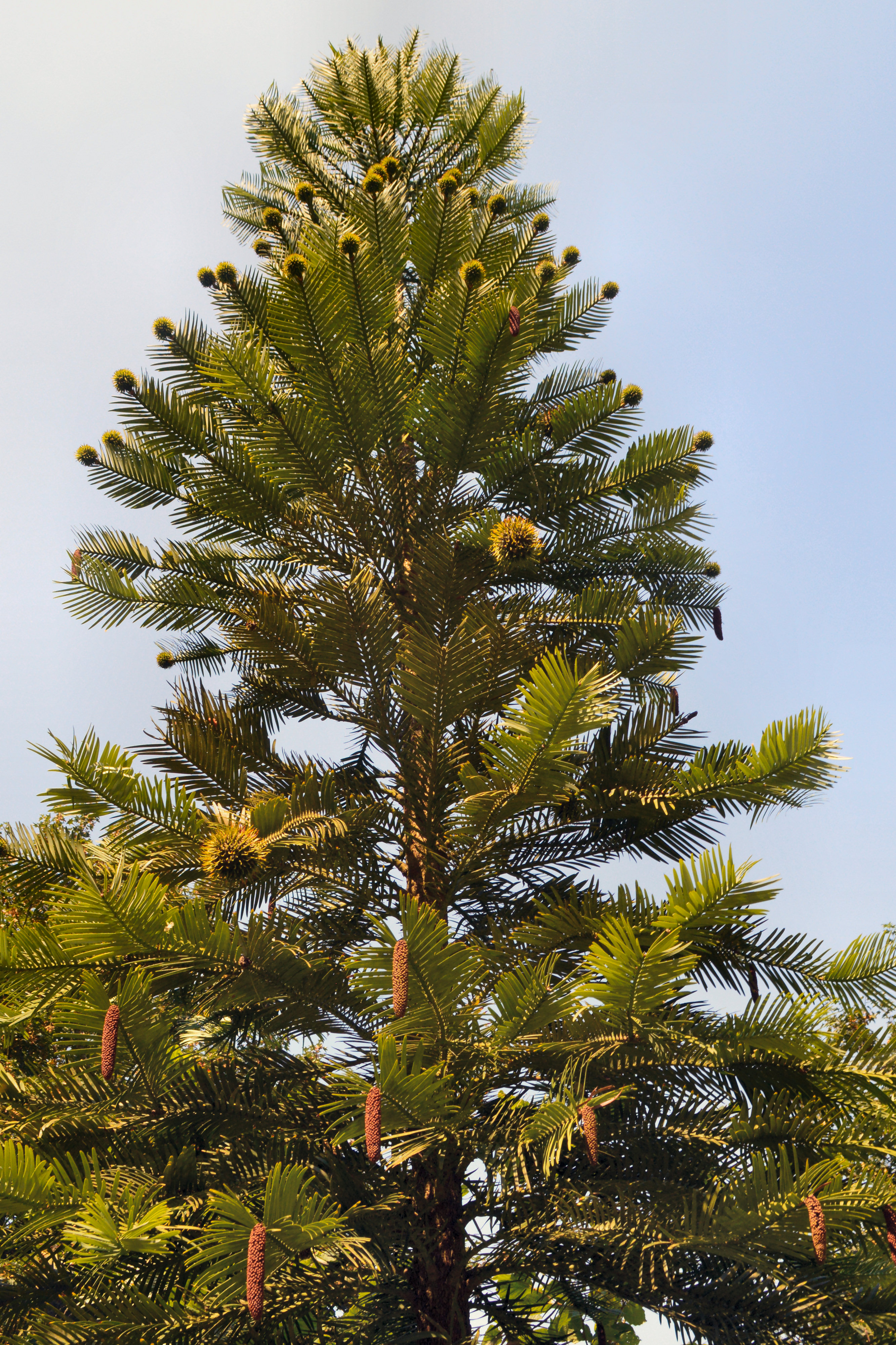
- Young tree with immature and mature seed cones and pollen cones

Conservation status
- Critically Endangered (IUCN 3.1)

Scientific classification
- Kingdom: Plantae
- Clade: Tracheophytes
- Clade: Gymnosperms
- Division: Pinophyta
- Class: Pinopsida
- Order: Araucariales
- Family: Araucariaceae
- Genus: Wollemia; W.G.Jones, K.D.Hill & J.M.Allen
- Species: W. nobilis

Binomial name
- Wollemia nobilis W.G.Jones, K.D.Hill & J.M.Allen, 1995

= Wollemia =

Genus of conifers

Wollemia nobilis is a species of coniferous tree in the family Araucariaceae. It is the single known species in the monotypic genus Wollemia. The species represents one of only three living genera in the family, alongside Araucaria and Agathis (being more closely related to the latter), which was discovered in 1994 in a temperate rainforest wilderness area of the Wollemi National Park in New South Wales. It was growing in a remote series of narrow, steep-sided, sandstone gorges 150 km (93 mi) north-west of Sydney. The genus is named after the National Park.

The Wollemi pine is classified as critically endangered (CR) on the IUCN's Red List, and is legally protected in Australia. After it was discovered that the trees could be successfully cloned, new specimens were planted widely around the world in regions with mild temperate climates.

A Recovery Plan was drawn up in 2007, outlining strategies for the management of this fragile population. The overall objective was to ensure that the species remains viable in the long term. Australian prime ministers and foreign affairs ministers have presented Wollemi pines to various dignitaries around the world.

Although often described as a "living fossil", there are no unambiguous fossils of Wollemia and potential fossil records of it have been considered uncertain.

== Description ==
Wollemia nobilis is an evergreen tree reaching 25–40 m (82–131 ft) tall. The bark is very distinctive, dark brown, and knobbly, quoted as resembling the breakfast cereal Coco Pops. The tree coppices readily, and most specimens are multiple-trunked or appear as clumps of trunks thought to derive from old coppice growth, with some consisting of up to 100 stems of differing sizes. The branching is unusual in that most of the side branches never have further branching. After a few years, each branch either terminates in one or a succession of cones (either male or female) for up to about 12 years. New branches then arise from dormant buds on the main trunk. As trees mature, side branches often turn erect and develop into secondary trunks, which then bear new sets of side branches, resulting in the multi-trunked trees in the wild population.

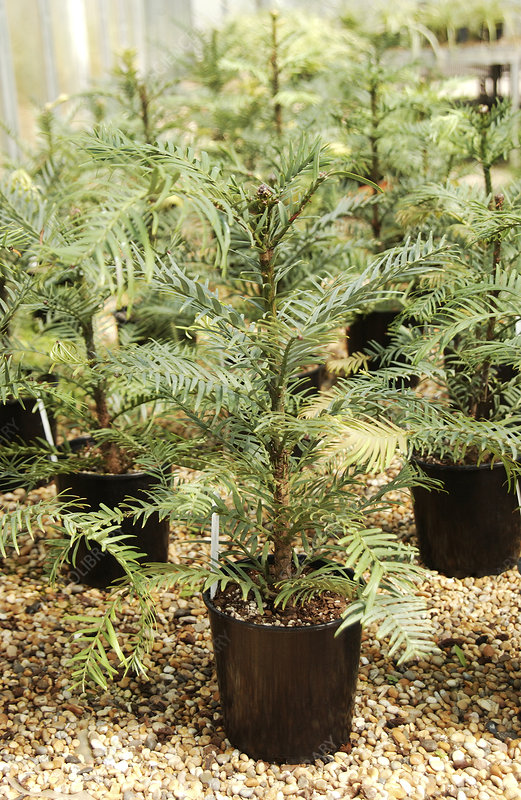
A 4-year-old potted Wollemi pine grown from cutting

The leaves are flat linear, 3–8 cm (1.2–3.1 in) long and 2–5 mm (0.079–0.197 in) broad. They are arranged spirally on the shoot but twisted at the base to appear in two or four flattened ranks. As the leaves mature, they develop from bright lime-green to a more yellowish-green. The seed cones are green, 6–12 cm (2.4–4.7 in) long and 5–10 cm (2.0–3.9 in) in diameter, and mature about 18–20 months after wind pollination. They disintegrate at maturity to release the seeds which are small and brown, thin and papery with a wing around the edge to aid wind-dispersal. The male (pollen) cones are slender conic, 5–11 cm (2.0–4.3 in) long and 1–2 cm (0.39–0.79 in) broad and reddish-brown in colour and are lower on the tree than the seed cones. Cone bearing starts at a young age; the trees planted at Kew in 1997 produced their first cones in 2008, when 10–11 years old. Seedlings appear to be slow-growing and mature trees are extremely long-lived; some of the older individuals today are estimated to be between 500 and 1,000 years old.

== History ==
=== Discovery ===
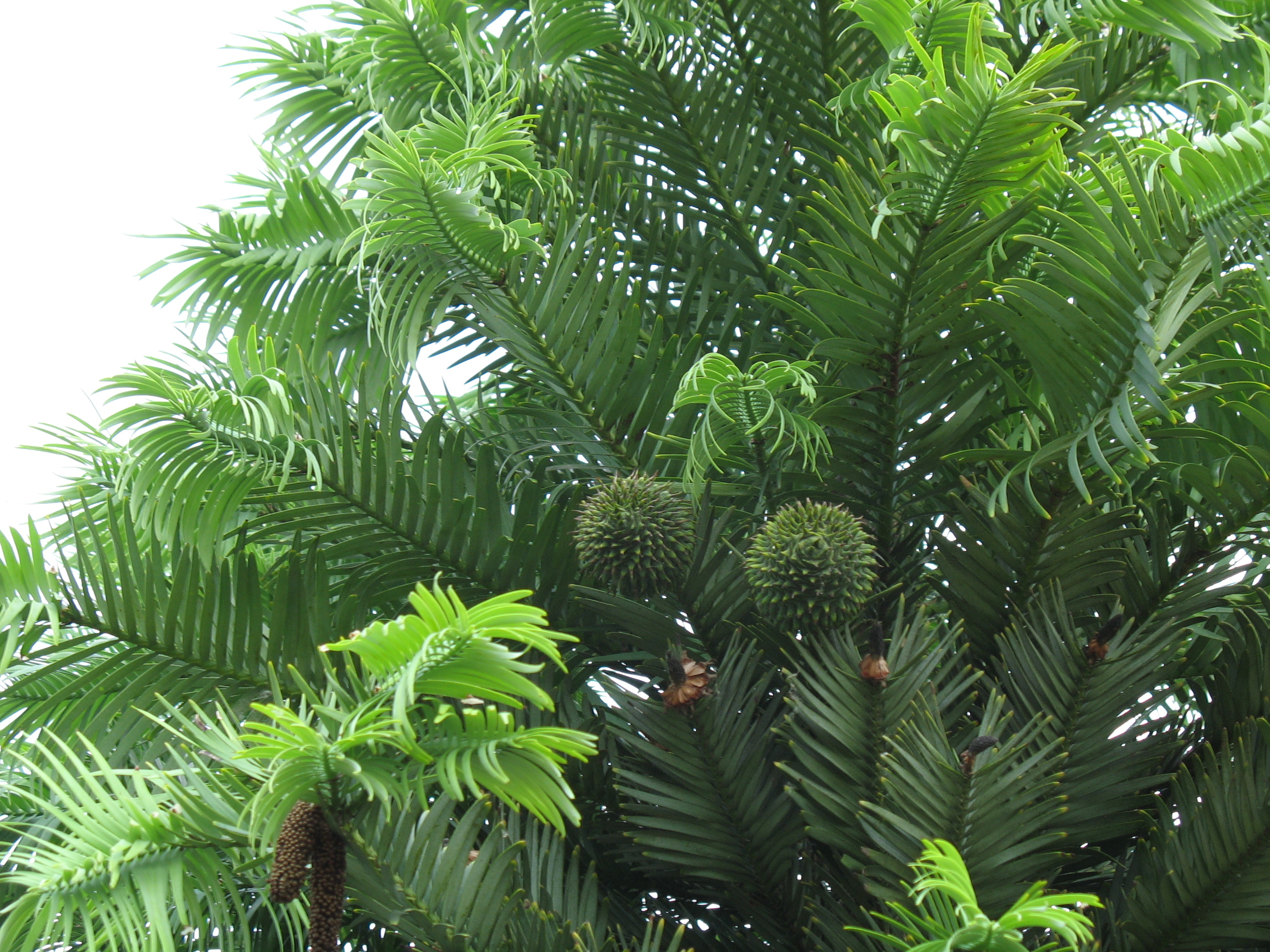
Male and female W. nobilis cones

The discovery, on or about 10 September 1994, by David Noble, Michael Casteleyn, and Tony Zimmerman, occurred only because the group had been systematically exploring the area, looking for new canyons. Noble had good botanical knowledge, and quickly recognised the trees as unusual because of the unique bark, and worthy of further investigation.

He took specimens to work for identification, expecting someone to be able to identify the plants. (Note: The discovery of the specimen's true identity, based upon knowledge of the literature on fossil remains, is similar to that of Gerard Krefft recognising the Queensland lung fish in January 1870.) His specimens were identified as new by Wyn Jones, a botanist with National Parks and Jan Allen from the Botanical Gardens. After the identification was made, National Parks then went under a veil of secrecy, with the discoverers not learning the full magnitude of their discovery for about six months. National Parks came close to damaging the stand when a helicopter used to collect cones inadvertently pruned one of the pines with its rotor. The species was subsequently named after David Noble.

The first illustrations of the Wollemi Pine were drawn by David Mackay, a botanical artist and scientific illustrator who was working at the Royal Botanic Gardens in Sydney when the species was discovered.

Further study would be needed to establish its relationship to other conifers. The initial suspicion was that it had certain characteristics of the 200 million year-old family Araucariaceae, but was not similar to any living species in the family. Comparison with living and fossilised Araucariaceae proved that it was a member of that family, and it has been placed into a new genus, beside the genera Agathis and Araucaria.

Fewer than 60 adult trees are known to be growing wild in four locations, not far apart. It is very difficult to count individuals, as most trees are multi-stemmed and may have a connected root system. Genetic testing has revealed that all the specimens are genetically indistinguishable, suggesting that the species has been through a genetic bottleneck 10,000–26,000 years ago, in which its population became so low (possibly just one or two individuals) that all genetic variability was lost.

=== Conservation threats ===
In November 2005, wild-growing trees were found to be infected with Phytophthora cinnamomi. New South Wales park rangers believe the virulent water mould was introduced by unauthorised visitors to the site, the location of which is still undisclosed to the public.

The grove of Wollemia trees was endangered by fire during the 2019–2020 Australian bushfire season. They were saved by specialist firefighters from the National Parks and Wildlife Service, supported by the Rural Fire Service who installed an irrigation system as well as dropping retardant.

=== Global involvement in conservation ===
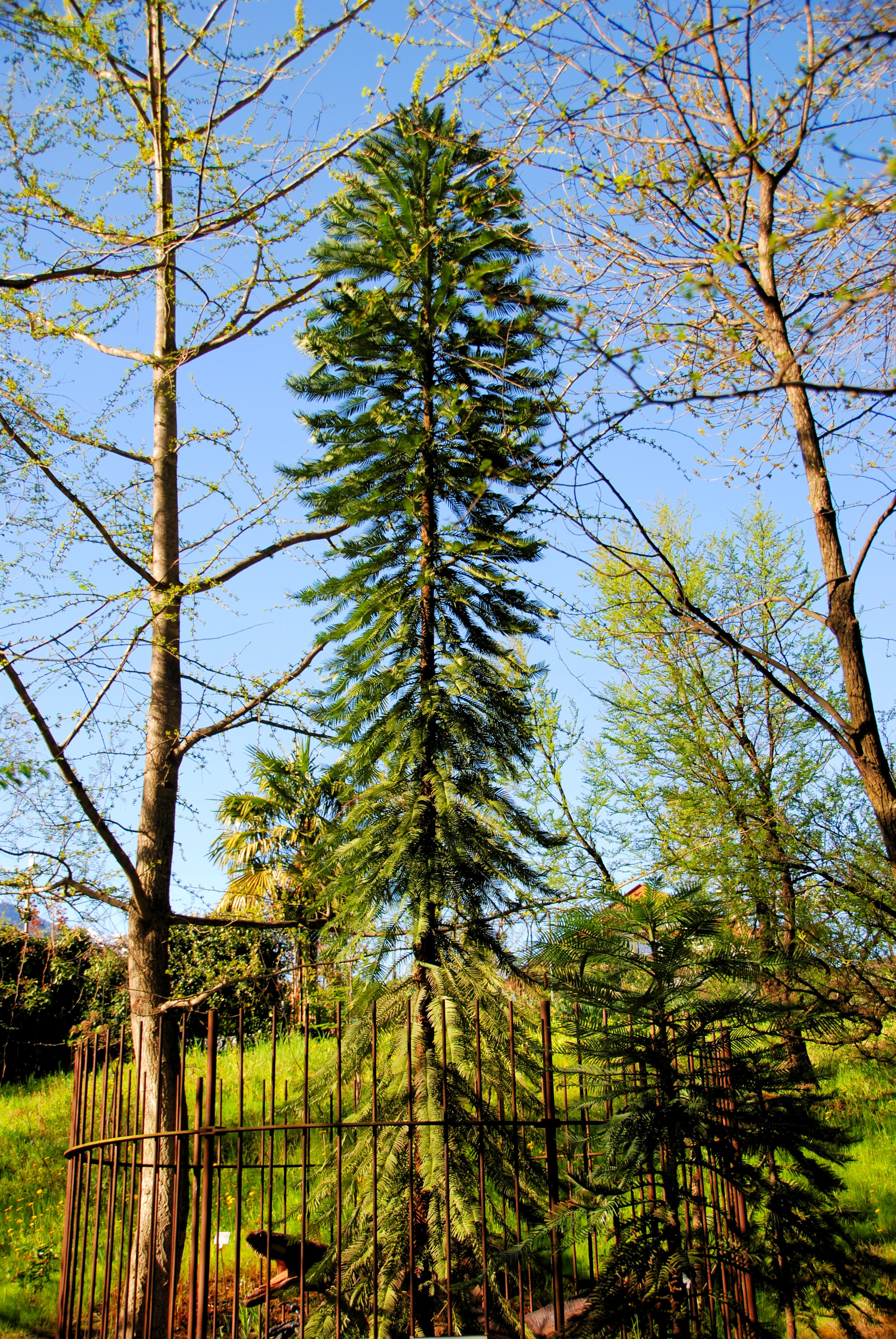
Wollemia nobilis in the botanical garden of Trauttmansdorff Castle Gardens in Merano, Italy in 2018

"Home gardeners become accidental citizen scientists for Wollemi Pine" was the headline of a 2023 news article reporting results of an unusual conservation strategy underway since 2005. Ten years after safeguarding of rooted branch cuttings had been initiated in botanic gardens around the world, commercial growers were authorized to receive surplus cuttings to propagate for sales to their own customers. This unusual management decision for an endangered plant owed to the "huge public interest in this rare tree" and as an experiment to test whether commercial availability would serve "to protect wild populations from illegal collecting."

Results were tallied from more than 1,500 people from 31 countries who were growing the cuttings and responded to an online survey created by two plant scientists in Australia. Results indicated that the species grows well where climate is temperate and there is adequate year-round rainfall. Loamy soils with good drainage proved to be ideal. The team concluded, "This study demonstrates that it is feasible to establish Wollemi pines in many parts of the world and under different climates and cultural regimes, which can help conserve this species in the face of climate change and other threats."

== Cultivation and uses ==
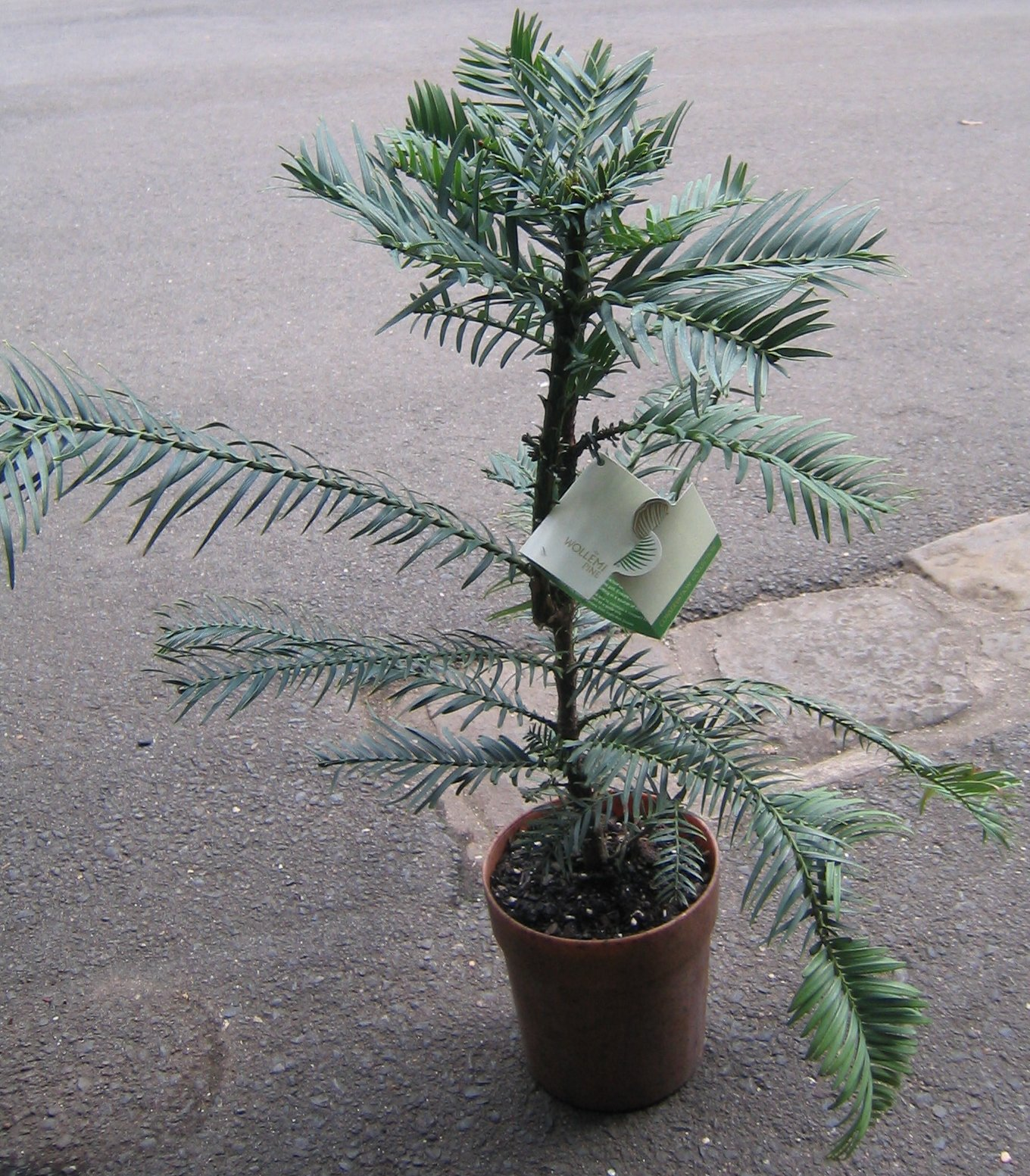
Cultivated Wollemia nobilis

A propagation programme made Wollemi pine specimens available to botanical gardens, first in Australia in 2006 and subsequently throughout the world. It may prove to be a valuable tree for ornament, either planted in open ground or for tubs and planters. In Australia, potted native Wollemi pines have been promoted as a Christmas tree. It is also proving to be more adaptable and cold-hardy than its restricted temperate-subtropical, humid distribution would suggest, tolerating temperatures between −5 and 45 °C (23 and 113 °F), with reports, from Japan and the United States, that it can survive down to −12 °C (10 °F). A grove of Wollemi pines planted in Inverewe Garden, Scotland, believed to be the most northerly location of any successful planting, have survived temperatures of −7 °C (19 °F), recorded in January 2010. It also handles both full sun and full shade. Like many other Australian trees, Wollemia is susceptible to the pathogenic water mould Phytophthora cinnamomi, so this may limit its potential as a timber tree.

The Royal Botanic Gardens in Sydney has published information on how to grow Wollemi pines from seed harvested by helicopters from the forest trees. The majority of seeds that fall from the cone are not viable so need to be sorted to retain the plump and dark ones. These can then be sown on top of seed raising mix and watered. Once the water has drained through the mix, the pot should be placed in a plastic bag and refrigerated for two weeks. After this, the pot should be removed from the plastic bag and placed somewhere warm but not very sunny until the seed germinates (remembering to keep them moist but not wet). This could take several months.

=== Care ===
The Wollemi pine is extremely hardy and versatile in cultivation. Despite it being an endangered species, it is easy to grow and requires relatively low maintenance. It will adapt to a diverse range of climatic zones, thriving in full sun to semi shaded outdoor positions. They can be maintained in a pot almost indefinitely, and make good container plants for patios, verandas, and courtyards. Because it tolerates air conditioning, it can also be used as an indoor decorative plant. They require well-drained soil and protection from frost.

=== Growth rate ===
The growth rate is fairly fast in good conditions, with the tallest reliably measured cultivated specimen being one planted in 2009 in Finistère, France, which had reached 8.1 metres tall when 14 years old in 2023.

== Phylogeny ==
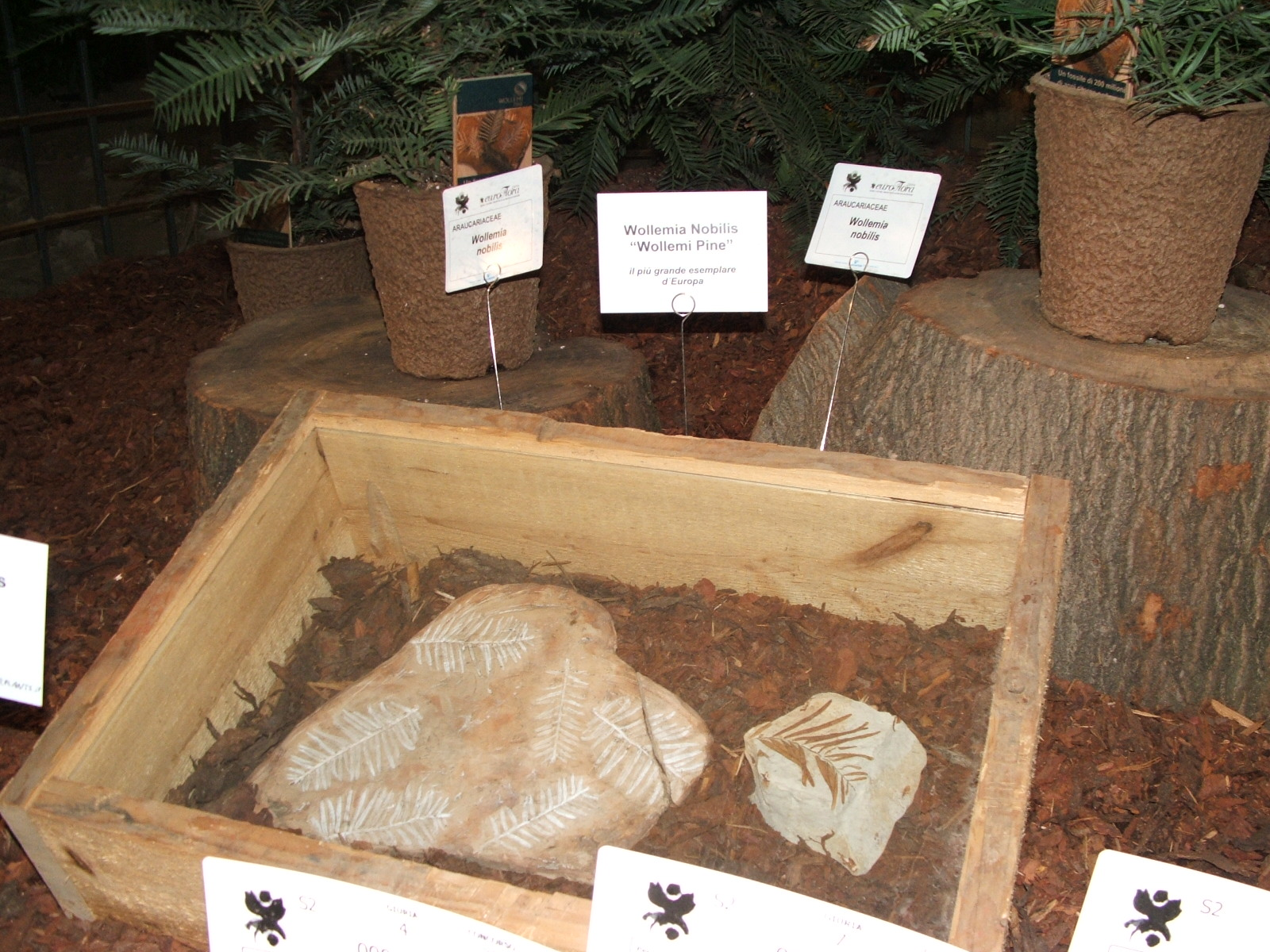
Fossils resembling Wollemia

The genus Wollemia shares morphological characteristics with the genera Araucaria and Agathis. Wollemia and Araucaria both have closely crowded sessile and amphistomatic (producing stomata on both sides of the leaf) leaves, and aristate bract scales, while Wollemia and Agathis both have fully fused bracts, ovuliferous scales, and winged seeds. Scrutiny of the fossil record likewise does not clarify Wollemia's relationship to Araucaria or Agathis, since the former has similarly disparate leaf characters in its adult and juvenile forms, and the latter has similar cone characters. Further, the recent description of several extinct genera within the Araucariaceae points to complex relationships within the family and a significant loss of diversity since the Cretaceous. An early study of the rbcL gene sequence places Wollemia in the basal position of the Araucariaceae and as the sister group to Agathis and Araucaria. In contrast, another study of the rbcL sequence shows that Wollemia is the sister group to Agathis, and Araucaria is basal. The different outgroup selection and genes used in previous studies are the reasons behind the discrepancy over the groupings of the three genera. Later genetic studies corroborate Wollemia's placement in the Araucariaceae as sister to Agathis based on data from the 28s rRNA gene, a combination of rbcL and matK genes, and a comprehensive study encompassing nuclear ribosomal 18S and 26S rRNA, chloroplast 16S rRNA, rbcL, matK and rps4, and mitochondrial coxl and atp1 genes.

Below is the phylogeny of the Araucariaceae based on the consensus from the most recent cladistic analysis of molecular data. It shows the relative positions of Wollemia, Agathis, and Araucaria within the division.

- Pinales
  - - Araucaria
  - - Wollemia
    - Agathis

=== Potential fossil record ===
There are no fossils that can be assigned definitively to Wollemia. Araucarioides leaves possibly representing Wollemia or a close relative have been reported from the Early Eocene of Tasmania. Some authors have suggested that the fossil pollen genus Dilwynites, known from the Late Cretaceous-Pliocene of Australia, New Zealand, Patagonia and Antarctica is assignable to Wollemia, however, the pollen of Wollemia is highly variable, and its similarity to Dilwynites has been questioned, with Dilwynites also closely resembling the pollen of some species of Agathis. It is therefore possible that Dilwynites pollen represents that of other araucarian conifers as well as possibly also Wollemia.

== Gallery ==
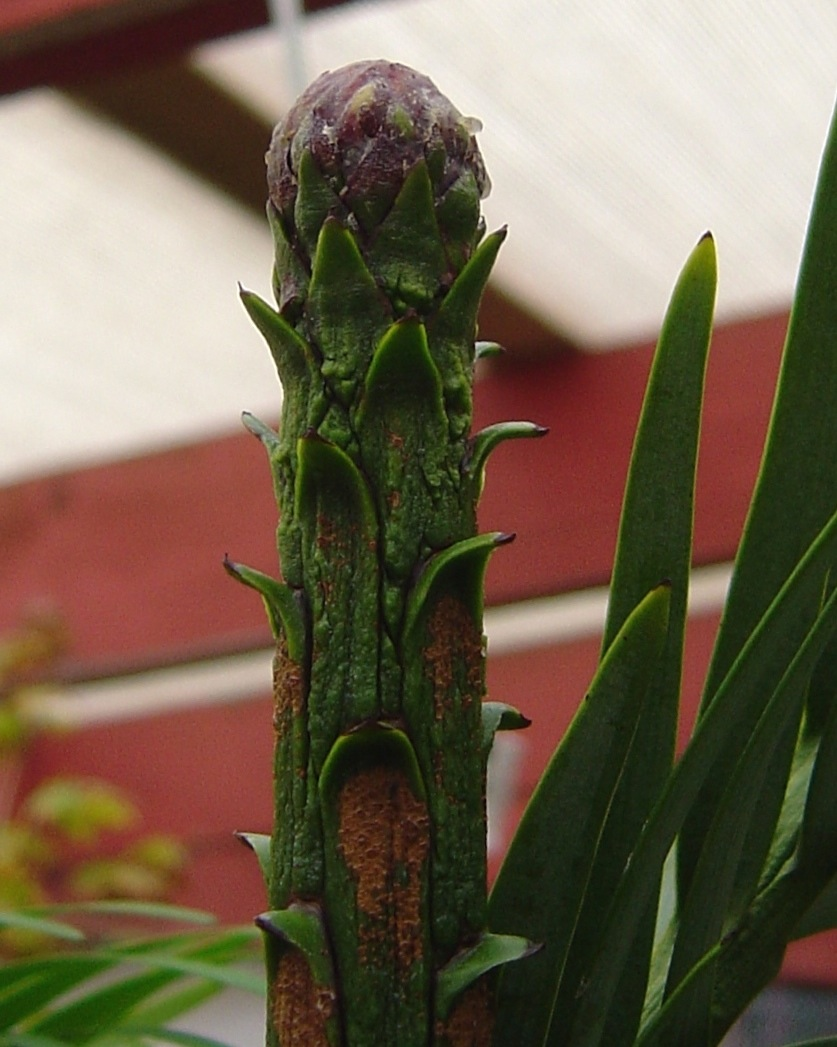
Apical shoots

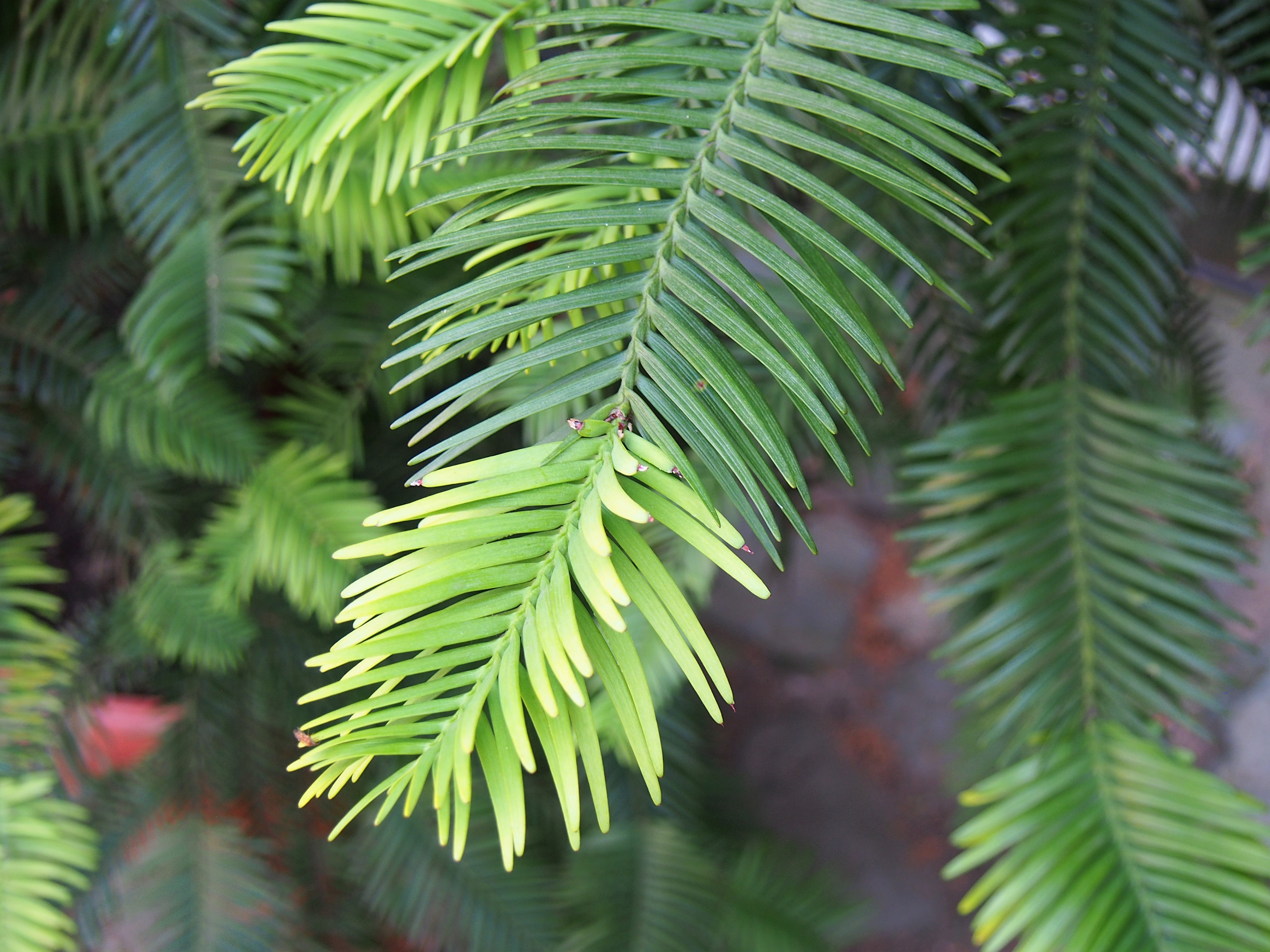
Leaves

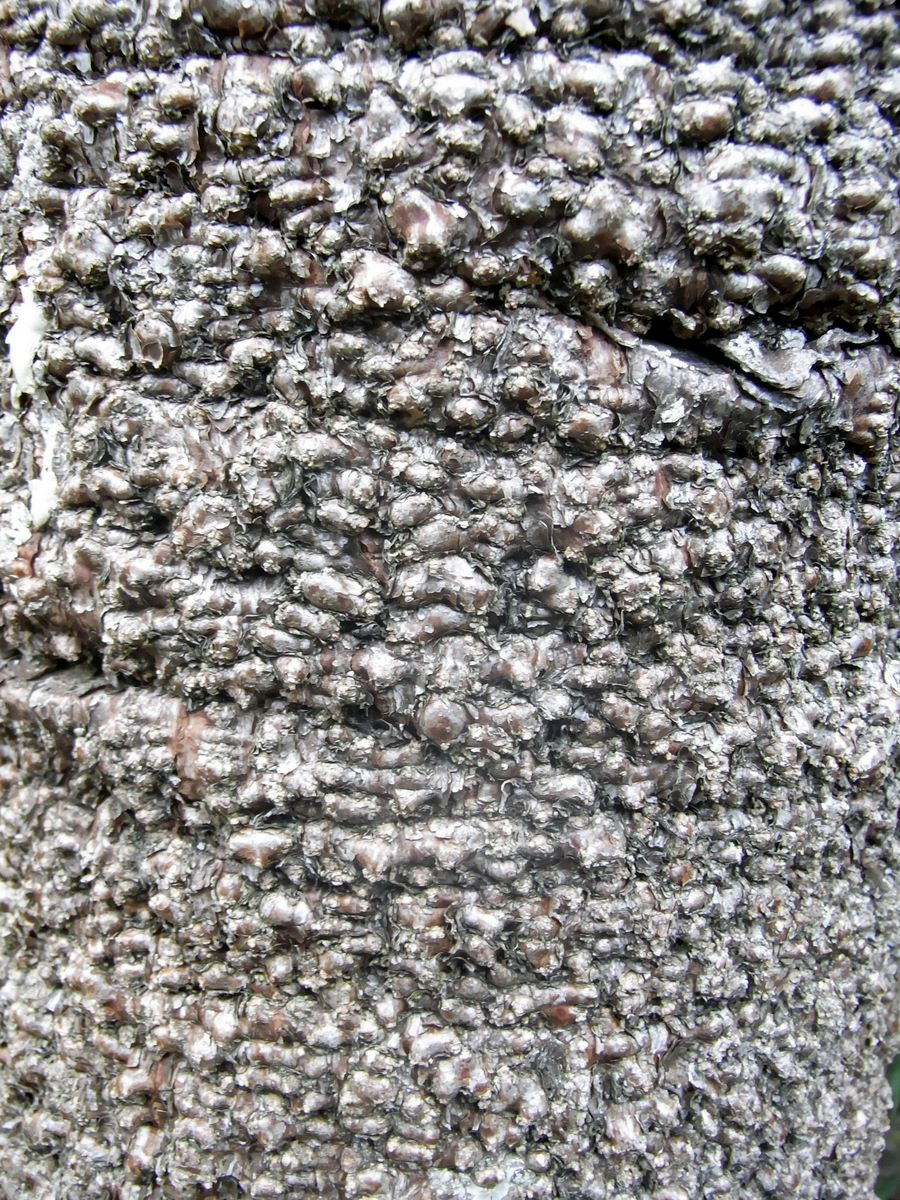
Bark

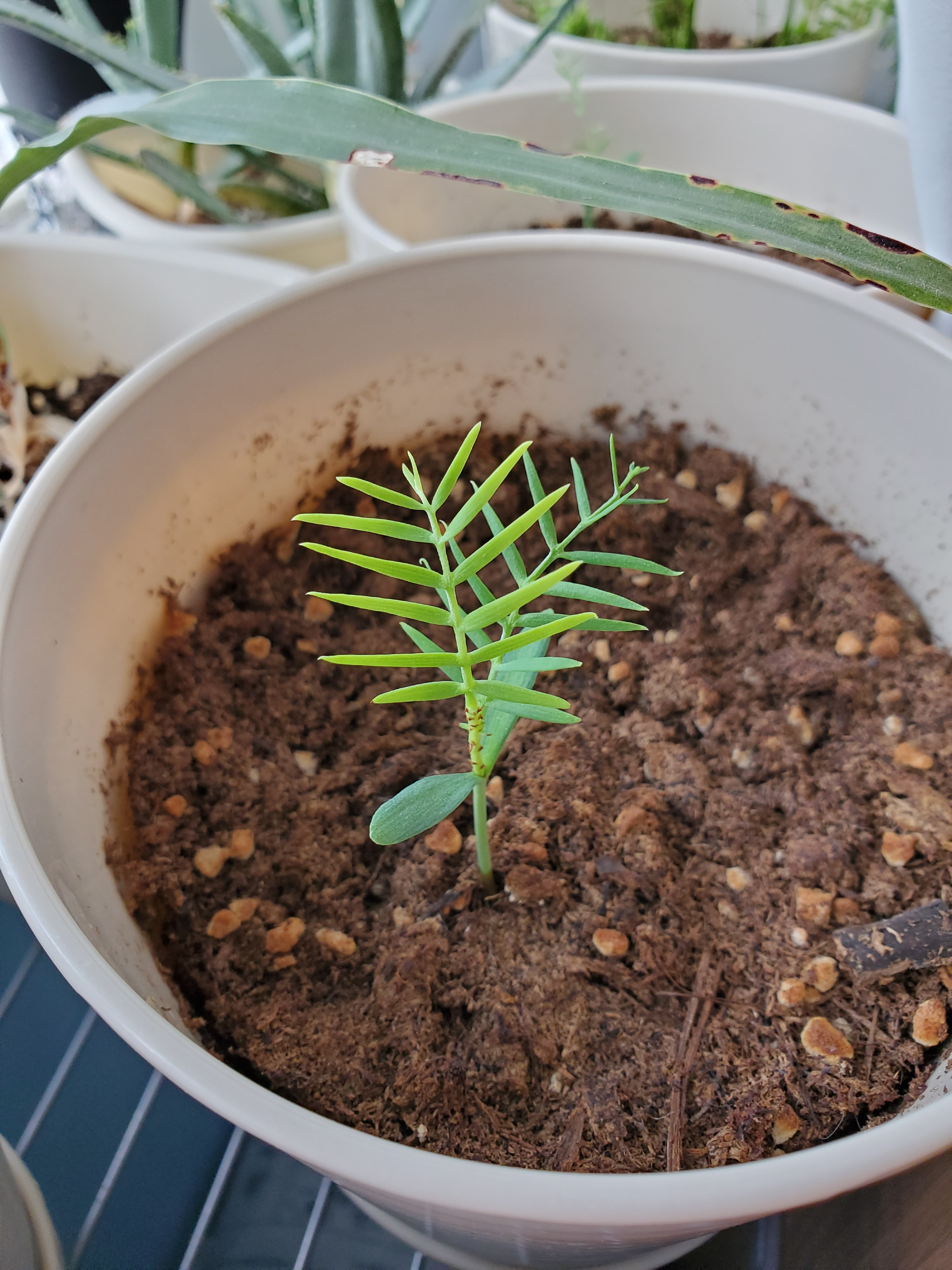
A 4 month old seedling

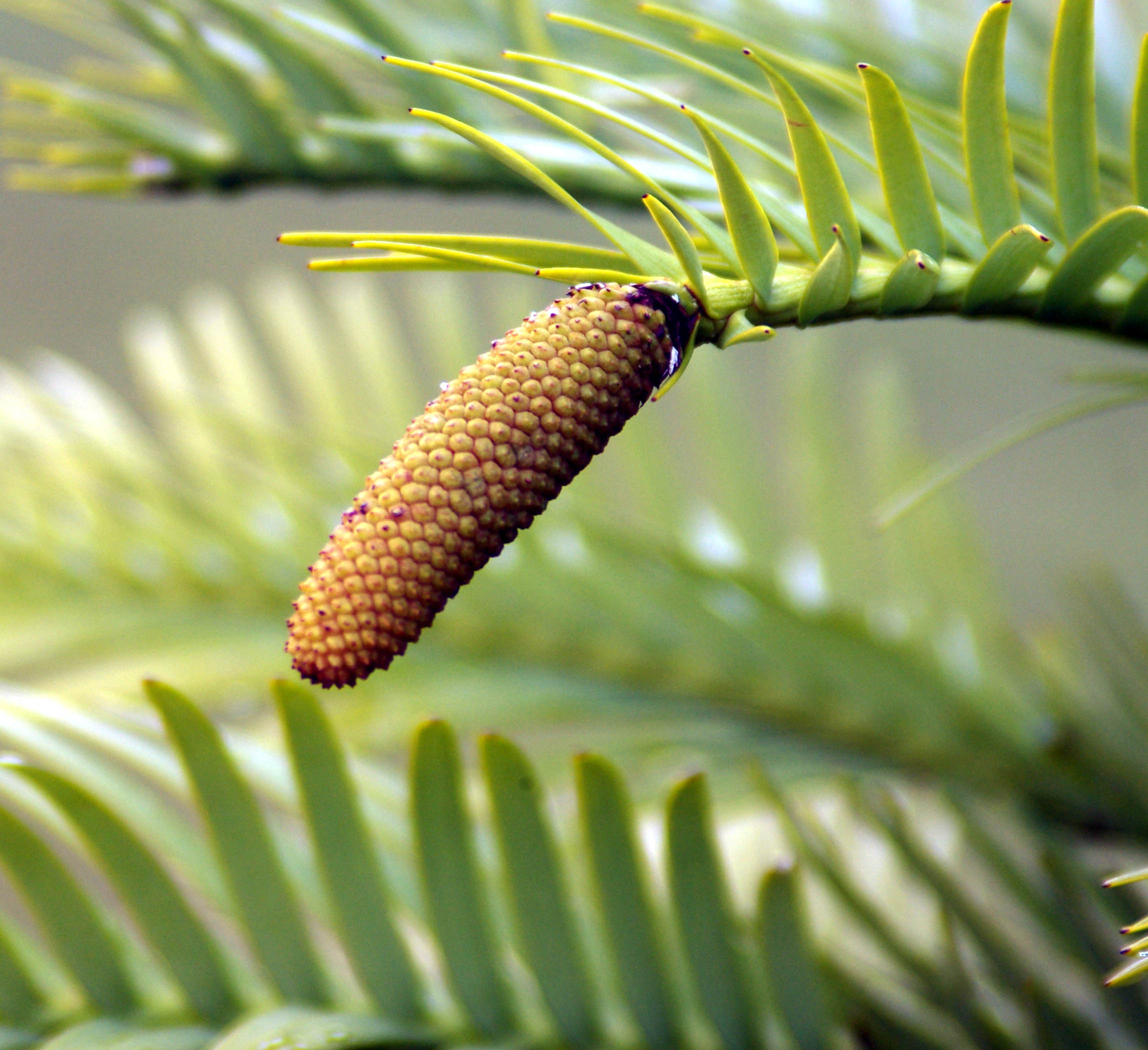
Young male (pollen) cone

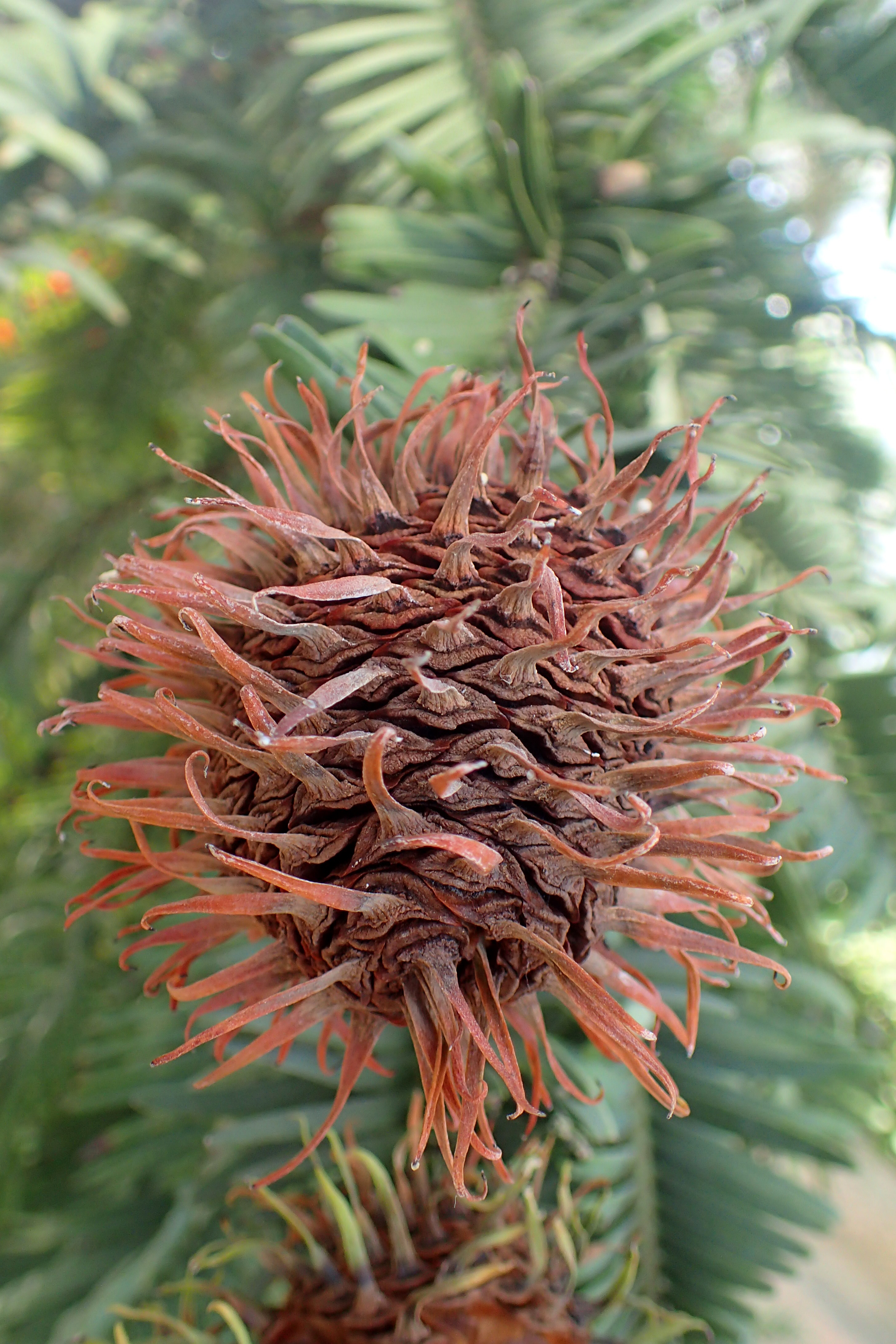
Female cones

Specimen in the Jardin des Plantes of Paris.

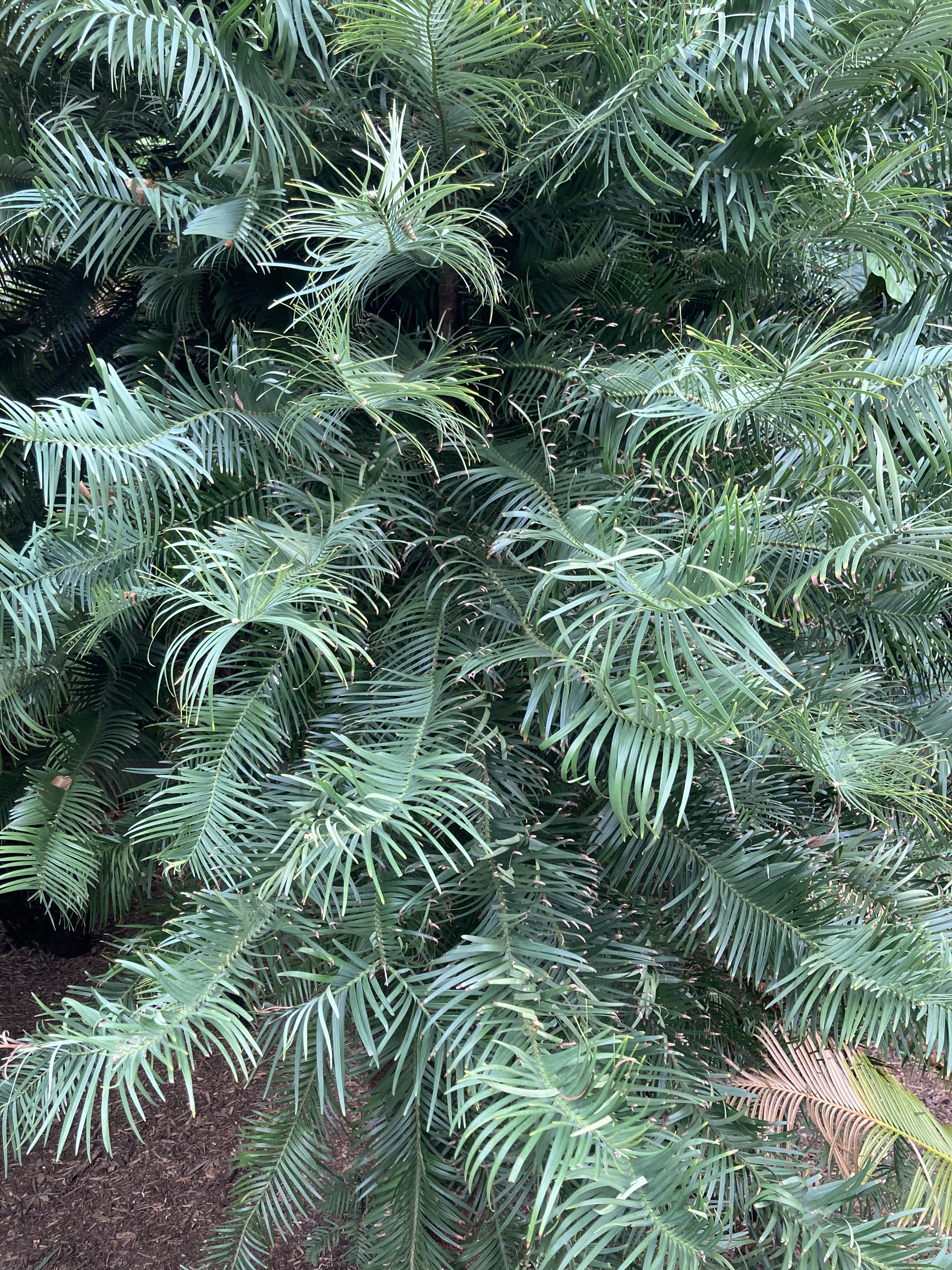
Wollemi leaves in California

== See also ==
- Gasteranthus extinctus, a species of plant believed to have gone extinct until it was rediscovered in 2022
