= Noble Township =

Noble Township may refer to:

== Illinois ==
- Noble Township, Richland County, Illinois

== Indiana ==
- Noble Township, Cass County, Indiana
- Noble Township, Jay County, Indiana
- Noble Township, LaPorte County, Indiana
- Noble Township, Noble County, Indiana
- Noble Township, Rush County, Indiana
- Noble Township, Shelby County, Indiana
- Noble Township, Wabash County, Indiana

== Iowa ==
- Noble Township, Cass County, Iowa

== Kansas ==
- Noble Township, Dickinson County, Kansas
- Noble Township, Ellsworth County, Kansas
- Noble Township, Marshall County, Kansas, in Marshall County, Kansas

== Michigan ==
- Noble Township, Michigan

== Missouri ==
- Noble Township, Ozark County, Missouri, in Ozark County, Missouri

== Nebraska ==
- Noble Township, Valley County, Nebraska

== North Dakota ==
- Noble Township, Cass County, North Dakota, in Cass County, North Dakota

== Ohio ==
- Noble Township, Auglaize County, Ohio
- Noble Township, Defiance County, Ohio
- Noble Township, Noble County, Ohio
