= Brian Noble =

Brian Noble may refer to:

- Brian Noble (bishop) (1936–2019), British Roman Catholic bishop
- Brian Noble (American football) (born 1962), American football player
- Brian Noble (rugby league) (born 1961), English rugby league footballer and coach
