= 1845 Grand National =

English steeplechase horse race

- Grand National
- Location: Aintree
- Date: 5 March 1845
- Winning horse: Cure-All (racehorse)
- Starting price: Not quoted
- Jockey: Mr William Loft
- Trainer: Christopher 'Kitty' Crisp
- Owner: William S. Crawford
- Conditions: Good to soft

The 1845 Grand Liverpool Steeplechase was the seventh annual running of a Handicap Steeple-chase, later to become known as the Grand National Steeplechase, a horse race which took place at Aintree Racecourse near Liverpool on Wednesday 5 March 1845 and attracted a field of 15 runners. It was won by the unconsidered outsider Cure-All, ridden by William Loft in a record time of 10 minutes, 47 seconds.

== The Course ==
The course was described as little changed from the previous year, save for the removal of several posts and rails at many of the banks, which led the course to be described of an easy character. Aside from the racecourse itself, the field towards the first fence and last field before re-entering the course were the only ones laid to turf, while the remainder of the course was plough or fallow land.

Start – Just beyond the Melling Road. Fence 1 [16] on the second circuit] Plain good fence. Fence 2 [17] Plain good fence. Fence 3 [18] Plain good fence. Fence 4 [19] Plain good fence. Fence 5 [20] Becher's Brook Fence 6 [21] A fence inclined to the left that takes the runners towards the Canal side. Fence 7 [22] A fence inclined to the left that takes the runners towards the Canal side. Fence 8 [23] A fence inclined to the left that takes the runners towards the Canal side. Fence 9 [24] A large water jump. Fence 10 [25] Out of the second field along the Canal. Fence 11 [26] Out of the third field along the Canal. Fence 12 [27] A fence into the Anchor Bridge Road. Fence 13 An artificial hurdle leaving the training ground on the racecourse proper. Fence 14 An artificial brook thirteen feet wide with a three-foot rail. Fence 15 A bank into and out of the lane. Fence 28 An artificial hurdle adjacent to the distance chair on the run in.

On jumping fence twelve the runners would continue onto the widest part of the course, known as the training ground, making the straight along the stands as long as possible a run before starting the second circuit. After jumping fence twenty-seven the runners would turn towards the racecourse at an earlier point, this time jumping the hurdle on the other side of the distance judge's chair.

In modern terms only Becher's Brook and the Water Jump are named from the modern course while the turn back alongside the Canal was more gradual with a water jump instead of the Canal Turn. Valentine's Brook was the tenth fence and while the incident it had been named for had taken place a few years earlier, the name hadn't yet stuck. The fence at Anchor Bridge was a Punchestown style bank sometimes referred to as the Table top, while the artificial hurdle at fence thirteen was in the location later to become known as the monument fence and today the Chair, where the distance judge was located. Because the competitors started the race beyond the lane, which later became Melling Road, they jumped the hedge into and then out of the lane just once, which was the fifteenth obstacle.

== Finishing order ==
| Position | Name | Rider | Age | Weight | Starting Price | Distance or fate | Colours |
| Winner | Cure-All | William Loft | | 11-05 | Not quoted | 2 lengths | White |
| Second | Peter Simple | John Frisby | | 11-12 | 9/1 | 2 lengths | Orange and white stripes |
| Third | The Exquisite | Larry Byrne | | 11-12 | Not quoted | A close fourth | White with light blue sleeves |
| Fourth | Tom Tug | John Crickmere | | 10-02 | 5/1 | | Black |
Non Finishers
| Distanced | The Romp | J Thompson | | 10-04 | Not quoted | May have passed the post fifth but was a distance behind the fourth horse | Blue |
| Distanced | Vanguard | Tom Olliver | | 12-10 | 4/1 favourite | Walked in after jumping the final hurdle | Pink with white sleeves |
| Distanced | Ceremony | Terry Abbott | | 11-00 | Not quoted | Not recorded | White with black sleeves |
| Distanced | Peter Swift | Horatio Powell | | 10-12 | 9/1 | May have fallen at second Valentines | Pink and black stripes |
| Distanced | The Stranger | H Hill | | 10-10 | 15/1 | Tailed off first circuit | Green with pink sleeves |
| Distanced | Nimrod | Joseph French | | 10-08 | 9/1 | Not recorded | Purple and white stripes |
| Distanced | Brilliant | William Noble | | 10-04 | 30/5 | Tailed off after refusing fence 11. | Red with white sleeves |
| Fence 22 | Boxkeeper | James Bradley | | 11-04 | Not quoted | Fell | Black with white sleeves |
| After fence 14 | The Page | William Holman | | 11-10 | 7/1 | Tailed off after refusing fence 2 and fall at fence 4 | Black with white sleeves |
| Fence 14 [Water Jump] | Clansman | J Kelly | | 11-06 | 12/1 | Fell fatally {broken back} | Not known |
| Fence 2 | Brenda | J Abbott | | 11-07 | 6/1 | Ran out and Fell | Not known |

Withdrawn - Crocus. Non Runners - Discount, Croesus, Ploughboy, Duenna, The Scavenger, Consul, Agriculture, The Knight Templar, Spitfire, Preissnitz and Moderidero

== Details ==
The race was delayed due to a protest from the owners of Cure-All and Crocus over the condition of the course. Heavy rain, followed by a sharp overnight frost left parts of the course in a very hard condition, which the two owners felt was unsafe for racing. The race commenced at 5pm after the remaining owners had voted to race. The owner of Crocus, Mr Robson withdrew his horse while Cure-All went on to win.

Tom Olliver was bidding to try to become the first rider to win the race three years in succession, having not missed any of the previous six official runnings of the race, while Horatio Powell was also taking part in the feature race of the meeting for a record seventh time, though one of those races was now regarded as an unofficial precursor to the National. Seven of the riders taking part were making their debut in the race, including William Loft. And the race was recorded by the press as the Grand National for the first time, though this was not yet the official name for the contest.

Only the first four horses to pass the finishing post were recorded as official finishers to the race. Another seven horse were recorded by the press as having passed the post but they were so far behind that they all finished among the many spectators who would follow the race on horse back and would enter the course when the winner passed the post. It may be that some, if not all of those who finished outside the first four bypassed the final obstacles. Another possible reason why they were not recorded as finishers is that a distance judge used to sit at a position beside the modern day chair fence and would declare any horse who had not reached his position by the time the previous horse passed the post as being distanced and would pull them up.

The winning owner and rider was William loft from Healing, Lincolnshire near Grimsby, although he leased the ownership of the horse to Mr Sterling Crawford for the Grand National. Loft also officially trained the horse as well but this duty was more likely handled by Christopher Crisp, known as Kitty. Crisp actually walked every step of the road from Grimsby to Liverpool with the horse and after their victory they returned home the same way with the Healing church bells sounded in their honour upon their arrival.

Loft was one of nine riders making their debut in the race while Tom Olliver was taking a record seventh ride in the race.

Clansman's fatal fall at the Canal Turn was the second equine fatality in the history of the race and the first for six years.

== Aftermath ==
In the years that followed, Tom Olliver regularly repeated his belief that Cure All's victory was only due to having not completed the entire course

John Crickmere's fourth place finish completed a hat-trick of consecutive finishes in the frame for the twenty-three year old jockey, having already won the race on board Discount the previous year. However, his career was cut short when diagnosed with consumption before the year was out, dying in 1846.

== Sources ==
- Irish Newsletter 1845
- The Times 1845
- Liverpool Mercury 1845
- The Field 1954
