= John Crickmere =

English steeplechase jockey

John Crickmere (1822- Oxford, 20 September 1846) was an English steeplechase jockey who took part in the Grand National steeplechase three times during the 1840s, finishing in the first four on each occasion and winning the race on Discount in 1844. In 1846 he developed consumption from which he died before the end of that year, aged 24 at St Clements in Oxford. His wife gave birth to their daughter just two hours after his death. Subscriptions were raised for her and her daughter in Oxford, and also in London by the owner of the horse on whom he'd won the National just two years earlier.
