= Noble High School =

Noble High School may refer to one of the following high schools in the United States:

- Noble High School (Oklahoma), Noble, Oklahoma
- Noble High School (Maine), North Berwick, Maine
- Central Noble High School, Albion, Indiana
- East Noble High School, Kendallville, Indiana
- West Noble High School, Ligonier, Indiana
- Noble Street Charter High School, Chicago, Illinois
