= Noble Bennet Pickett =

American physician (1801–1884)

Member of Massachusetts State Legislature
- In office 1851–1852

Personal details
- Born: January 19, 1801 Sherman, Connecticut, U.S.
- Died: February 5, 1884 (aged 83) Great Barrington, Massachusetts, U.S.
- Spouse: Laura Giddings (m. 1834; died 1879)
- Children: 1
- Education: Yale University
- Occupation: Physician; politician

Noble Bennet Pickett (January 19, 1801 – February 5, 1884) was an American medical doctor and politician from Massachusetts.

== Early life ==
Noble Bennet Pickett was born on January 19, 1801, to Sarah (née Giddings) and Bennet Pickett, in North Society, New Fairfield, Connecticut (later called Sherman). He spent 10 years teaching and during that time studied medicine. In 1834, he graduated from Yale Medical School.

== Career ==
After graduating, Pickett started a practice in North East, Duchess County, New York, but a year later at the request of his friends moved to Great Barrington, Massachusetts, where he remained the rest of his life. In 1839, he purchased a farm called "Hawley Pixley" in North Plain near Van Deusenville, Great Barrington.

Pickett served as a member of the Massachusetts State Legislature during two sessions, in 1851 and 1852. He was a member of the town's school committee from 1862 to 1863. Around 1870, he was overtaken by blindness and stopped his public service.

== Personal life ==
Pickett married Laura Giddings, daughter of Jonathan Giddings, of Sherman on September 6, 1834. They had one daughter. His wife died in 1879. He was a member of the Congregational Church.

During the last 10 years of his life, he had epileptic seizures. He died on February 5, 1884, at the house of his daughter in Great Barrington.
