= Elmer Noble =

American zoologist

- Born: 16 January 1909; Pyongyang, Korea
- Died: 8 March 2001 (aged 92)
- Education: University of California, Berkeley (BA, MA, PhD)
- Known for: Description of the pathogenic myxosporean Ceratomyxa shasta
- Scientific career
- Fields: Protozoology, parasitolog, botany
- Workplaces: University of California, Santa Barbara
- Author abbrev. (botany): E.R.Noble

Elmer Ray Noble (16 January 1909 – 8 March 2001) was a United States professor of zoology at the University of California, Santa Barbara, and an internationally recognized protozoologist and parasitologist.

Noble was born in Pyongyang, Korea, to American Methodist missionary parents, William Arthur Noble and Mattie Wilcox Noble. He lived with his family in Korea until 1927, when he and his identical twin brother, Glenn Arthur Noble, moved to the United States to attend the University of California, Berkeley, where he earned a B.A. in zoology, an M.A. in zoology, and a Ph.D. in protozoology and parasitology.

Noble joined the UC Santa Barbara faculty in 1936, where he worked for 38 years before retiring in 1974.

At UC Santa Barbara, he was, in turn; Chairman of the Department of Biological Sciences, Dean of Liberal Arts, Acting Provost, Acting Chancellor, Vice Chancellor, and Vice Chancellor for Graduate Affairs.

He held administrative offices in the following professional societies:

- President, Society of Southern California Parasitologists
- Vice-President, American Microscopical Society
- President, Society of Protozoologists
- President, American Society of Parasitologists

In 1971, Noble and his twin co-authored: PARASITOLOGY. The Biology of Animal Parasites. Elmer R. Noble and Glenn A. Noble. Lea & Febiger, Philadelphia.

In 1978, the former Biological Sciences Building at Santa Barbara was renamed Elmer Ray Noble Hall in his honor.

In addition to his teaching and research, he is remembered for the first description of the pathogenic myxosporean, Ceratomyxa shasta. His contributions to this field have also been recognized with the patronymy of two species of myxozoan, Myxidium noblei Zubchenko & Krasin, 1980 and Myxobolus noblei (Sarkar, 1982).

According to both the International Plant Names Index and the Harvard Herbarium, Noble was also a botanist.
