= Merrill E. Noble =

American judge (1896–1969)

Merrill Emmett Noble (December 5, 1896 – November 13, 1969) was a justice of the New Mexico Supreme Court from August 1, 1960 until his death on November 13, 1969.

Born in Savoy, Illinois to James Houston and Harriett (Baird) Noble, Noble received an LL.B. from the University of Illinois in 1920. In 1963 he was awarded a Doctor of Laws degree from Highlands University. He married Martha Van Petten in 1920, and their children were James V. Noble, Dr. Merrill E. Noble, and Margaret Noble Bentley.

Noble was admitted to the New Mexico Bar in 1920. He had a private law firm in Las Vegas, New Mexico from 1920 until 1960. He served as the Las Vegas City Attorney from 1924-1925 and again from 1949-1953. He also served as Assistant District Attorney for the Fourth Judicial District of New Mexico from 1937-1945. He was President of the Board of Regents of Highlands University from 1937-1943. From 1955-1956 he served as President of the New Mexico Bar Association.

In 1960, Governor John Burroughs appointed Noble to the New Mexico Supreme Court to succeed the retiring James B. McGhee. Noble "received the support of the legal community in Santa Fe and the north", and was confirmed without controversy.

Noble immediately had to run for reelection to the seat, despite an initial determination by the Attorney General that he would not have to run until 1962, the Supreme Court ruled that Noble's name should appear on the ballot for the election in that year. Noble won the election as the Democratic candidate. He served the remaining two years of the previous term, and was subsequently re-elected in 1962, where he "proved to be an active campaigner", visiting by his own assessment "every town in the state". Noble served as Chief Justice of the New Mexico Supreme Court from January 1, 1969 until his death that year.
