= William Nobles =

William Nobles may refer to:

- William Nobles (cinematographer), American cinematographer
- William H. Nobles, military officer, businessman, and politician

== See also ==
- William Noble (disambiguation)
