= Warren Noble (inventor) =

Warren Noble (1885–1950) was a British-born American automotive engineer and inventor, the inventor of an electric stove.
