= William Noble (missionary) =

American Methodist missionary

- Hangul: 노보을 or 노블
- Hanja: 魯普乙
- Revised Romanization: No Bo-eul or Nobeul
- McCune–Reischauer: No Boŭl or Nobŭl

William Arthur Noble (September 13, 1866 – January 6, 1945), who published under the name W. Arthur Noble, was an American missionary of the Methodist Episcopal Church in Pyongyang, Korea and Seoul, Korea from 1892 to 1934.

== Biography ==
Noble was born in Springville, PA. He was married to Mattie Wilcox Noble; their children included Ruth Noble Appenzeller Knight, Harold Joyce Noble, born January 19, 1903, who went on to become a Japanese language officer with the United States Marine Corps during World War II and later a United States diplomat in South Korea, Marine Biology professor at University of the Pacific and director of the Marine Research Laboratory at Dillon's Beach, CA, Alden Earl Noble, (1899-1961), and identical twins, Glenn Arthur Noble and Elmer Ray Noble, born January 16, 1909. Noble died in Stockton, CA.

== Publications ==
- Ewa: A Tale of Korea. Jennings and Graham. 1906.
