= David W. Noble =

American historiographer (1925–2018)

David Watson Noble (March 17, 1925 – March 11, 2018) was an American historian and historiographer, specializing in American intellectual trends and thought. He was a professor of American Studies at the University of Minnesota.

Noble was the youngest of four children. Raised on a dairy farm in Princeton, New Jersey, Noble saw first hand how the depression hurt families. His family farm was foreclosed on during the depression. Noble briefly served in the army during World War II, but was honorably discharged because of an injury that he received. Thanks to the G.I. Bill, he earned his undergraduate degree from Princeton University. Noble then went on to complete his doctorate from the University of Wisconsin–Madison. He began his teaching career at the University of Minnesota in 1952. Noble was initially a faculty member of the History Department, but later in his career he transferred over to the American Studies Program. Noble retired in 2009.

Noble published over 250 articles and book reviews. The University of Minnesota began annually presenting the David Noble Lecture Series at the Minnesota History Museum in Saint Paul in the spring of 1996. The Lecture continues each April at the University of Minnesota. The octogenarian professor taught until his retirement in the spring of 2009. He often mentioned to his students that one of his claims to fame was that he “delivered milk to Einstein’s house when he was a boy.” Noble had his phone tapped by Army Intelligence and the FBI during the Vietnam War.

Noble lived in an extended family household with his wife, his daughter and her husband, his granddaughter and her husband, and their two children (his great-grandchildren). He stated that he enjoyed living in an extended family because, "[he] rejects the culture of modernity and identifies with traditional cultures".

== Works ==
- The Paradox of Progressive Thought, 1958
- Historians Against History: The Frontier Thesis and the National Covenant in Historical Writing since 1830, 1965
- The Eternal Adam and the New World Garden, 1968
- The Progressive Mind, 1981
- The Restless Centuries: A History of the American People, (with Peter Carroll), 1973/1979
- The Free and the Unfree: A Progressive History of the American People, 1992/1997/2001 (with Peter Carroll)
- Twentieth Century Limited: A History of Recent America, 1980 (with Peter Carroll and David A. Horowitz)
- The End of American History: Democracy, Capitalism and the Metaphor of Two Worlds in American Historical Writing, 1880-1980, 1985
- Death of a Nation: American Culture and the End of Exceptionalism, 2002
- Debating the End of History: The Marketplace, Utopia, and the Fragmentation of Intellectual Life, 2012
