= Cure-All =

British racehorse

- Sire: Physician
- Grandsire: Brutandorf
- Sex: Gelding
- Foaled: 1838
- Country: United Kingdom
- Colour: Brown
- Owner: William Stuart Stirling-Crawfurd
- Trainer: William Loft

Major wins
- Grand National (1845)

Cure-All (foaled 1838) was a half-bred racehorse by Physician out of an unknown dam who won the 1845 Grand National Steeplechase when an unconsidered outsider.

== Background ==
The horse was foaled in Yorkshire and in 1843 was taken to the then prestigious Horncastle horse fair where he was offered at £240. The well known and respected steeplechase owner and rider Captain William Peel took an interest in the horse and requested he be allowed to take it for a ride before purchasing, as was the custom. However while out on this ride Peel found the horse to have gone lame and returned it to the representative of the owner with an apology but no offer to purchase.

At the end of the week a friend of Captain Peel's, William Loft enquired as to the welfare of the horse and when told that it was still lame he made an offer of £50, which was accepted. Cure-All initially was used as a farm hack for Loft before being put to the hunting field.

== Racing career ==
Cure-All showed such a good jumping ability and speed as a hunter that it was suggested he be entered into a match with a highly regarded local chaser named Crocous. Despite losing almost 100 yards when going the wrong side of the flag at one obstacle and falling during the race, Cure-All was still beaten only a neck in the contest, bringing him to the attention of racehorse owner William Stuart Stirling-Crawfurd.

Sterling-Crawfurd had placed an entry for his well fancied Rat Trap in the 1845 Grand National but when that horse was forced to withdraw through injury he was allowed to nominate a substitute to run in his colours of white with black sleeves and cap. Loft agreed to allow a lease of Cure-All to run as a nominee on condition that Loft himself be allowed to ride.

The horse was walked most of the way from Healing, Lincolnshire to Aintree, arriving there on the evening before the race in a very poor looking state, which led to the bookmakers offering the horse the next day at any price the public wished to offer, so poor were his chances thought to be.

In addition Tom Olliver, the twice winning rider of the National who on the favourite Vanguard commented to Loft as they left the paddock that his horse looked like a Lincolnshire prize ox and might do well to complete one circuit of the course.

In addition Cure-All's position in the race had hung in the balance for some time prior to the off as his nominee owner, Sterling-Crawford being one of two owners who lodged a protest of over the safety of the ground on which the race was to be run, claiming that the rain of the previous night, followed by a sharp overnight frost had left the ground too hard. When he was outvoted by his fellow owners he decided not to withdraw the horse and the conditions worked in Cure-All's favour, coming past many tired horses to win in a new record time.

One of the first riders to congratulate William Loft was Tom Olliver who, after admitting his error of judgement before the race then joked that Loft must have stopped at a farmhouse during the first circuit before rejoining the runners on the second.
