= William Noble (jockey) =

English jockey (b. 1814, d. 1897)

William Noble (1814–1897) was a 19th-century English jockey, best known for winning the first Cambridgeshire Handicap in 1839.

== Personal life ==
Noble was born in 1814 at Whitewall Corner, a hamlet in the township and parish of Norton, Yorkshire. He was baptised on the 17 August that year. His parents were Mark and Jane (née Maughan). Noble's father was the winning jockey of the first-ever running of the Manchester Cup in 1816 on Friend Ned.

Noble married Ann Knight on 25 October 1845 in the Parish of Dirleton, East Lothian, Scotland. William and Ann had at least four children: Margaret Noble, (born circa 1847 in Scotland); William (born 1849 at Richmond, North Yorkshire, died 16 January 1926 at Whitelees, Symington, Ayrshire, Scotland); Georgina Ann Noble (born 1851 at Richmond, North Yorkshire, died 14 March 1916 at Ratho Station, Midlothian, Scotland); and Martha Jane Noble (born circa 1853 at Gullane, died 9 April 1921, Coupar District, Scotland).

In the 1851 census, Noble was living with wife Ann, and children Margaret, William and Georgina Ann, residing with his brother George and his family at 48 Albert Place in Richmond, Yorkshire. His occupation was given as ‘Groom’.

In 1896, Noble was the oldest living (retired) jockey in the country. By this time, he was in poor health and had financial difficulties due to the failure of the bank in which he had invested his savings – an article published in the Morning Post on 2 March 1896 encouraged readers to contribute additional relief for Noble and his wife, in addition to the £15 he received annually from the Bentinck Benevolent Fund.

Noble suffered from asthma and epilepsy at the time of his death in Gullane, East Lothian on 19 September 1897, aged 83.

== Career ==
Noble won the inaugural running of the Cambridgeshire Handicap on Lanercost, who was carrying 8st 9 lb and giving 23 lbs to runner-up Hetman Platoff. The race was run over 9 furlongs on the Rowley Mile at Newmarket in October 1839. The race is still run to this day, forming part of the annual Betfred Cambridgeshire Meeting and being the first leg of the historic Autumn Double (the second being The Betfred Cesarewitch at Future Champions Festival).

Two years later, in 1841, he rode Lanercost to victory in the Ascot Cup, beating rival Beeswing. William also won the Ayr Gold Cup on four occasions – in 1836 (Despot), 1840 (The Doctor), 1842 (The Recorder), and 1843 (The Shadow). Noble rode Brilliant in the 1845 Grand National but was recorded as a non-finisher. In the 1850 edition of Ruff's 'Guide to the turf', Noble is recorded as a jockey working in Richmond for Mr Stirling Davidson and Mr R. Stephenson, and operating as a Trainer in his own right.

In his later years, Noble was a horse trainer in Gullane, which in the middle part of the 19th century was referred to as the ‘Newmarket of the North’. In his book, ‘Turf Memories of Sixty Years’, Alexander Scott describes how “long streams of thoroughbreds would be seen galloping over the beautiful old turf on the hilltop.” According to Scott, in the early 1860s William would sit at night with other trainers including James Binnie and Jos Arnold, making matches between horses they trained for various owners, to be decided early the following morning on the Downs for a side stake of £1.
