= David Noble (canyoner) =

Australian botanist (born 1965)

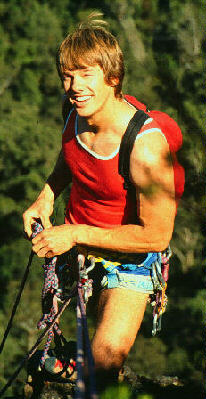
David Noble on top of the Second Sister in the Blue Mountains, New South Wales.

David 'Dave' Noble (born 1965) is an Australian canyoner, explorer, and botanist who on or about 10 September 1994 discovered the Wollemi pine. Thus, resulting in the scientific name of this species, Wollemia nobilis, is named after him.

John and Olive Noble, David's parents, emigrated from England to Australia when he was two years old.

A modern-day explorer, Noble has visited sites in the Wollemi National Park that few if any other people have seen and is known for exploring the canyons of the Wollemi Wilderness. He has named over two hundred remote features, including the canyons Twister and Hole in the Floor. At the time of discovering the Wollemi pine, Noble was a field officer with the NSW National Parks and Wildlife Service. After his discovery Noble completed a bachelor of applied science degree and was promoted to a ranger.
