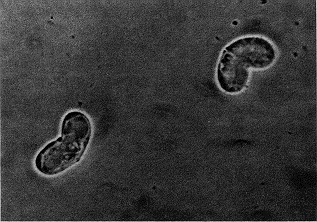
- Ceratomyxa shasta spores

Scientific classification
- Kingdom: Animalia
- Phylum: Cnidaria
- Class: Myxosporea
- Order: Bivalvulida
- Family: Ceratomyxidae; Doflein, 1899

= Ceratomyxidae =

Family of cnidarians

Ceratomyxidae is a family of myxozoans.

== Genera ==
- Ceratomyxa Thélohan, 1892
- Ceratonova Atkinson, Foott et Bartholomew, 2014
- Ellipsomyxa Køie, 2003
- Meglitschia Kovaljova, 1988
