= Kenneth Dewar =

British Royal Navy officer (1879–1964)

Vice-Admiral Kenneth Dewar CBE
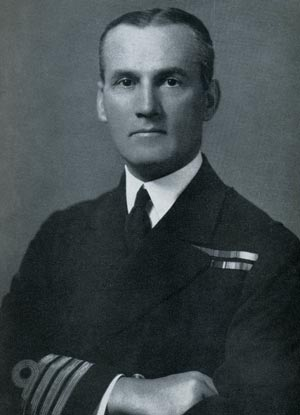
- Dewar as a captain
- Born: 21 September 1879; Queensferry
- Died: 8 September 1964 (aged 84); Worthing
- Military career
- Allegiance: United Kingdom
- Branch: Royal Navy
- Service years: 1893–1929
- Rank: Vice-admiral
- Commands: HM Gunnery School, Devonport; HMS Roberts; HMS Calcutta; HMS Capetown; HMS Royal Oak; HMS Tiger; HMS Iron Duke
- Conflicts: First World War; Dardanelles campaign; Dover Patrol

Vice-Admiral Kenneth Gilbert Balmain Dewar CBE (21 September 1879 – 8 September 1964) was an officer of the Royal Navy. After specialising as a gunnery officer, Dewar became a staff officer and a controversial student of naval tactics before seeing extensive service during the First World War. He served in the Dardanelles Campaign and commanded a monitor in home waters before serving at the Admiralty for more than four years of staff duty. After the war ended he became embroiled in the controversy surrounding the consequences of the Battle of Jutland. Despite this, he held a variety of commands during the 1920s.

In 1928 he was at the heart of the "Royal Oak Mutiny", when as captain of the battleship Royal Oak he forwarded his executive officer's letter of complaint about their immediate superior, Rear-Admiral Collard, to a higher authority. This came in the wake of a series of incidents aboard ship. All three men were ordered back to Britain, and Dewar and his executive officer requested Courts-martial so that they might defend themselves. The trials were held in Gibraltar and garnered widespread media coverage.

Dewar, though found partially guilty, survived with a severe reprimand. His executive officer was found guilty and resigned, while Collard was compelled to resign his commission for provoking the situation. Having then commanded successively the two oldest capital ships in the fleet, Dewar retired on promotion to rear-admiral. His memoirs, published as The Navy from Within in 1939, were a vitriolic indictment of the Navy's practices.

== Early life and career ==
Dewar was born in Queensferry on 21 September 1879, the son of Dr. James and Mrs. Flora Dewar. In July 1893 he was nominated as a naval cadet, passed the entrance examination and joined the training ship Britannia, where he studied for two years. Two of his brothers joined the navy; Alfred Charles (born 1876) who was promoted to captain on the Retired List and was appointed Head of the Historical Section of the Naval Staff, and Alan Ramsay (born 1887) who achieved Flag Rank in 1938. Dewar performed so well in Britannia, that upon graduation, he was appointed Midshipman straight away, which normally required a year's service at sea and passing an examination. He joined the protected cruiser Hawke on 20 August 1895. The following year he was appointed to the battleship Magnificent on 30 October 1896. Promoted acting sub-lieutenant, Dewar was confirmed in that rank on 15 February 1899 and promoted to lieutenant on 15 February 1900. Following promotion he was posted to the Devonport destroyer Osprey on 15 March, and on 12 June that year he was appointed to the torpedo-boat destroyer Fervent.

=== Gunnery officer ===
Following this period at sea, Lieutenant Dewar was selected to specialise in gunnery duties. His time training at HMS Excellent, the gunnery school at Portsmouth, coincided with that of the captaincy of Percy Scott, the renowned gunnery expert. His performance on the two-year course was so impressive that on graduation he was given command of a ship. In 1903 and 1904, Lieutenant Dewar was lent as the officer commanding the Chatham-based destroyer Mermaid during the summer Naval Manoeuvres.

Dewar became the gunnery officer of the armoured cruiser Kent on 24 August 1905, where he remained until 1908. Dewar's dedication and standard of training became evident when his ship led the Fleet in battle practice firings and gunlayer's-test. He was reassigned to Excellent on 19 January 1908 for instruction duties. Soon he was sent to sea again, being made gunnery officer of the battleship Prince George on 8 February 1908. He rejoined Excellent on 22 December that year. On 11 June 1909 Dewar was "lent" as gunnery officer to the protected cruiser Spartiate for the annual fleet manœuvres. Once the manœuvres were finished, Dewar was made assistant to the Inspector of Target Practice, an important gunnery position at the Admiralty on 17 July.^{[a]} In the same year, he was asked to lecture on the Imperial Japanese Navy, which he had previously had experience of, at the Royal Naval War College at Portsmouth. During his talk, he exhibited an unpalatable forthrightness by saying that the Royal Navy needed more intellectual officers like Togo Heihachiro, implying that there was a dearth of such officers. The President of the College, Lewis Bayly, abruptly terminated his lecture.

On 1 January 1910, Dewar was once more given sea duty as first lieutenant and gunnery officer (referred to as "1st and G") of Dreadnought. Dreadnought was still one of the most prestigious postings in the fleet despite the growing number of newer dreadnought battleships and battle cruisers entering service. It was Dewar's misfortune during this service to be taken in by the Dreadnought hoax on 10 February, in which he escorted a party of practical jokers, that included Virginia Woolf, pretending to be Abyssinian royalty, on an official visit to the battleship. However, Dewar befriended the captain, Herbert Richmond, who acted both as a friend and a mentor to him in the following years. With Richmond's encouragement, Dewar began a thorough study of naval tactics and strategy which would later continue at the Royal Naval War College.

=== Promotion to commander ===
Dewar was reappointed to Dreadnought on 28 March 1911, was promoted Commander on 22 June and on 14 December he was appointed for duty at the Royal Naval War College, Portsmouth as an instructor. The next year, he was selected to join the newly formed War Staff at the Admiralty, created on First Lord of the Admiralty Winston Churchill's orders in 1912. He was consequently reappointed for duty at the War College on 2 April 1912. On 4 March 1913, it was announced that Commander Dewar had been awarded the Gold Medal and Trench-Gascoigne Prize by the Royal United Service Institution for his winning essay on the question "What is the war value of oversea commerce? How did it affect our naval policy in the past and how does it in the present day?" The final chapter of the paper was suppressed from publication by the Admiralty; in it Dewar advocated a "distant" blockade in a war with Germany at a time (1912) when the Royal Navy was still contemplating a "close" blockade of the German coastline. In the event, a distant blockade was imposed. Dewar was then and remained unsympathetic to the removal of his concluding chapter;

In light of later events, the opposition aroused by my proposals may seem extraordinary, but they marked [in his opinion] a complete break with tradition and were far from obvious at the time.

Dewar's reputation as an intellectual within the Navy was confirmed when in 1912, he became one of the founder members of The Naval Review, an independent journal of Royal Navy officers. That year Richmond had formed a "Naval Society" with a dozen friends, Dewar among them. After Richmond went abroad on active service, Dewar decided that instead of being a society of purely discussion, it ought publish a journal, to which end he "raised subscriptions for the first issue from some forty or fifty officers of all ranks".

In 1914, Dewar was appointed commander (second-in-command) of the battleship Prince of Wales, then flagship of the 5th Battle Squadron in the 2nd Fleet (Home Fleets). On 28 July, Dewar married Gertrude Margaret Stapleton-Bretherton, the sister of Evelyn, Princess Blücher, in a service at St. Bartholomew's Church in Rainhill on Merseyside. The service was conducted by the Archbishop of Liverpool and the Bishop of Portsmouth. Dewar's best man was the Honourable Reginald Plunkett, who later became known as Reginald Plunkett-Ernle-Erle-Drax, and would go on to achieve high rank in the Navy. Dewar and Gertrude had one son together, Kenneth Malcolm J. Dewar.

== First World War ==
Prince of Wales during the First World War

In August 1914, Britain went to war with Germany, and later that year with the Ottoman Empire (modern-day Turkey). Prince of Wales remained in the 5th Battle Squadron until 1915, when with a number of other pre-dreadnoughts she was sent to the Eastern Mediterranean to support the Gallipoli landings, the goal of which was to capture the strategically important Dardanelles Straits, take Constantinople and knock the Ottoman Empire out of the war. As second-in-command of Prince of Wales, Dewar was present for part of the naval operations in the Dardanelles Campaign against the Turkish positions. Following aborted attempts to lend heavy-gunfire support to the troops at ANZAC Cove, Dewar wrote an unofficial memo to the Rear-Admiral commanding the Eastern Mediterranean Squadron, with suggestions for the employment of indirect fire to attack Turkish targets. Dewar heard nothing of his proposals, and it was not until November 1915 that indirect fire was used with good effect by the bulged cruiser Edgar. Following the campaign, in October Dewar was given command of HM Gunnery School, Devonport. It was an important position as large numbers of Reserve and Volunteer Reserve officers either re-qualified or qualified in gunnery duties. After a year Dewar returned to sea in command of the Abercrombie class monitor Roberts, and joined the Dover Patrol in August, 1916.

In response to the German battle cruiser raids on the British coast, a visible response was called for to quell public anxiety. On 27 May 1916, Roberts arrived at Gorleston to act as a guard ship for the port of Yarmouth, in effect acting as a coastal defence battery. Roberts fulfilled such duties at Tyneside and in the Thames Estuary for the rest of the war. Once again, Dewar was rotated back to shore, and was appointed to the Operations Division of the Naval Staff under first the Jellicoe, and then the Wemyss Boards of Admiralty. Dewar was promoted to the rank of captain on 30 June 1918 in the Half-Yearly lists and then became Assistant Director of Plans in the Plans Division. On 17 October 1919, he was appointed Commander of the Order of the British Empire (CBE) "for valuable services at the Peace Conference, Paris."

== Post-war commands ==
=== Jutland controversy ===
While still at the Admiralty, Dewar became embroiled with the controversies surrounding the aftermath of the Battle of Jutland. The manner in which the battle had been fought had come under criticism, with a line drawn between those who supported Sir John Jellicoe, who had commanded the Grand Fleet at the battle; and those who fell-in behind his then-subordinate and successor, Sir David Beatty. Dewar followed the Beatty school of thought espoused by his former captain, Herbert Richmond, that the battle had been lost by the staid admirals of the battleship squadrons. In November 1920 he and his brother Captain Alfred Dewar (retired) were entrusted with compiling the Naval Staff Appreciation of the battle, which was completed in January 1922. The two brothers had produced a body of work which favoured Beatty, for whom the Dewars' "capacity for original thinking and literary talents always held an appeal." Even Richmond, who intensely disliked Jellicoe and was a confidant of Beatty, agreed with the Committee on Imperial Defence's official naval historian, Sir Julian Corbett who wrote that Dewar's "facts were, I found, very loose."^{[b]}

The Appreciation, which had originally been intended for distribution around the Royal Navy, was deemed so full of "far-reaching and astringent criticism of Jellicoe" and of a new and therefore irrelevant tactical theory that Beatty and his Board of Admiralty were compelled to decide against its publication. Indeed, Admirals Roger Keyes and Ernle Chatfield were moved to write to Beatty that if published the Appreciation "would rend the service to its foundations". The final straw had been the very public heckling of Dewar when he lectured from his Appreciation to the twenty students of the Senior Officers' War Course at the Royal Naval College, Greenwich. It was decided to expurgate the existing document, which had been removed from circulation and release it. It was published as The Narrative of the Battle of Jutland in 1924.

All copies of the original Appreciation were ordered destroyed in 1928 and before the "Narrative" had been published Dewar and his brother had already been barred access to the original. However, he continued to have a major impact on the historiography of the Battle of Jutland by serving throughout the 1920s as Winston Churchill's naval consultant on submarine-warfare. Churchill wrote an anti-Jellicoe tract in his World Crisis, Volume III which in large measure shared Dewar's views on tactics and even some diagrams. Although Dewar would later become a supporter of the Labour Party, after Churchill was passed over for a cabinet position in 1931 Dewar wrote to him on 16 November, "I am very sorry to see that you are not in the new Cabinet. I had hoped you would go to the Admiralty and do very necessary work for the Navy."

=== Sea duty ===
After four years of duty at the Admiralty, Dewar returned to sea in 1922. He was fortunate after the "Geddes Axe" (the systematic contraction of the Naval Service to a size substantially smaller than its pre-war level) and his controversial tenure at the Admiralty that he was still considered worthy of sea duty, the qualification for promotion to flag rank. He was appointed on 9 May to command the C class cruiser Calcutta, flagship on the North America and West Indies Station. In 1923, Dewar was given command of Calcutta's sister-ship on the same station, HMS Capetown. While on the station, he had occasion to act as Flag Captain to the Commander-in-Chief on the station, pay calls on cities as diverse as Halifax, Nova Scotia, Quebec City and Boston while cruising the Eastern Seaboard of North America. During the U.S. blockade of the Mexican port of Tampico in 1924, Dewar and Capetown cancelled their planned cruise of the Caribbean to adequately represent the British government at Vera Cruz, proceeding there on 4 January.

On 15 May 1924, Dewar was relieved in command of Capetown by Captain G.H. Knowles, DSO. On 2 May 1925, he returned to the Admiralty as Deputy Director of Naval Intelligence. After two years in the position, he was relieved in June 1927 and given from 15 October command of the battleship Royal Oak, flagship of the Rear-Admiral in the 1st Battle Squadron, Mediterranean Fleet. The Rear-Admiral, 1st Battle Squadron was Bernard St. George Collard.

== "The Royal Oak Mutiny" ==
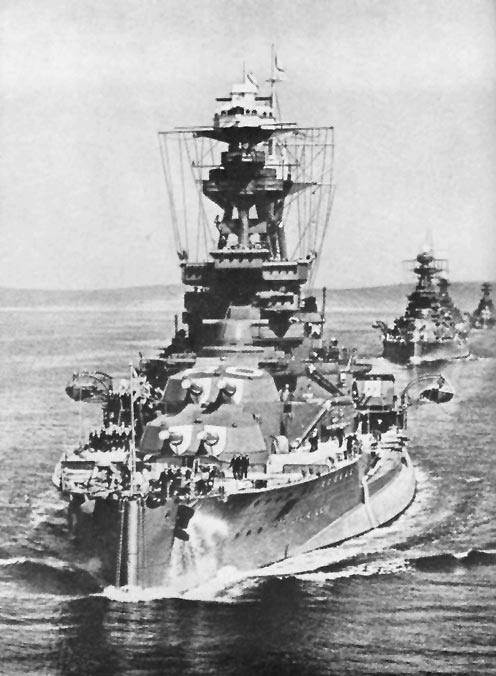
Royal Oak between the wars

As Flag Captain to Admiral Collard, Dewar was technically Collard's chief staff officer as well as captain of Royal Oak. A good working relationship between Dewar and the second-in-command of the battle squadron was necessary.^{[c]} Notwithstanding, Collard on occasion acted imperiously and tactlessly on his flagship, causing friction with Dewar and his executive officer, Commander Henry Martin Daniel, DSO. At a dance on the quarterdeck on 12 January 1928, Collard openly lambasted Royal Marines Bandmaster Percy Barnacle and allegedly said "I won't have a bugger like that in my ship" in the presence of ship's officers and guests. Dewar and Daniel accused Collard of "vindictive fault-finding" and openly humiliating and insulting them before their crew, referring to an incident involving Collard's disembarkation from the ship on 5 March where the admiral had openly said that he was "fed up with the ship"; Collard countercharged the two with failing to follow orders and treating him "worse than a midshipman".

Dewar and Daniel, feeling that morale was sinking due to these public displays, wrote letters of complaint which were given to Collard on 10 March, on the eve of a major exercise. Collard forwarded the letters to his superior, Vice-Admiral Sir John Kelly; he immediately passed them on to the Commander-in-Chief, Admiral Sir Roger Keyes. On realising that the relationship between the two and their Flag Officer had irretrievably broken down, Keyes ordered the exercise postponed by fifteen hours and ordered a court of inquiry to be convened. As a consequence, Collard was ordered to strike his flag in Royal Oak^{[d]} and Dewar and Daniel were ordered back to Britain. The Admiralty was informed of the bare facts on 12 March and Keyes proceeded to sea with the Mediterranean Fleet for the exercise as planned. The press picked up on the story worldwide, describing the affair—with some hyperbole—as a "mutiny". Public attention reached such proportions as to raise the concerns of the King, who summoned William Bridgeman, the First Lord of the Admiralty, for an explanation.

Having arrived back in England, Dewar and Daniel gave their version of events at the Admiralty, and put in writing requests for reinstatement in their positions in Royal Oak, or trial by court-martial. Having received Keyes' full dispatch on 16 March, the Board of Admiralty resolved that Dewar and Daniel should undergo trial by court-martial as soon as possible at Gibraltar, where Royal Oak was due to be berthed. Consequently, Dewar and Commander Daniel departed Southampton in the P&O liner Malwa with their counsel, Mr. Day Kimball, and their wives, on 24 March and reached Gibraltar in the evening of 27 March. The two officers were immediately attached to the Gibraltar base ship, HMS Cormorant in accordance with naval custom. It was arranged that Daniel would face court-martial first, on 30 March, and Dewar's would follow at its conclusion.

The courts-martial were held publicly in hangar "A" of the aircraft carrier Eagle. Because ten captains from the fleet sat as members of the court, the departure of the Mediterranean Fleet was delayed until the end of the proceedings. Out of four charges which Daniel faced, two related to writing an allegedly subversive letter (the complaint) and the other two to publicly reading it out to officers of Royal Oak. Dewar consequently faced the charge of having forwarded said subversive letter. The court found Daniel "guilty" on all four charges in the afternoon of 3 April and dismissed him from his ship and ordered him to be severely reprimanded.^{[e]}

External image
- "Syncopated discipline recital on the Royal Oak"; The "Mutiny" Courts-martial were both criticised and satirised in the press, as exemplified by this Evening Standard cartoon by David Low

Dewar's own court-martial began on 4 April. The court trying him was composed of five rear-admirals and eight captains. Dewar pleaded "not guilty to two charges of accepting and forwarding a letter subversive of discipline and contrary to King's Regulations and Admiralty Instructions". Dewar had the opportunity of cross-examining Rear-Admiral Collard over the incident of the dance and the disembarkation. Collard admitted to saying certain things, but refused to say that he had used improper words and not in earshot of anyone other than the captain.

In his defence, Dewar attacked one of the charges against him, namely that of contravening Article 11 of King's Regulations; he declared the charge invalid because his actions did not "bring him into contempt", and from witness testimony he portrayed himself as having acted in the best interests of his ships, his actions against Rear-Admiral Collard having been made out of a sense of duty and loyalty and not malice. Discounting one charge, he said, meant that the first had to fail as well.

The court reached its verdict on 5 April. The first charge was found proven, the second unproven, and Dewar was therefore acquitted of acting against regulations. However, despite his spotless record, when the court sentenced him to be dismissed from HMS Cormorant, and severely reprimanded—a potentially career-destroying result. However, there was some popular support for his continued service in the Navy. Questions were asked in the House of Commons as to whether Dewar or Daniel would be found new positions. The First Lord, Bridgeman, stated that they would be found positions in the Navy as soon as vacancies arose. Dewar's career was reprieved for the time being. Daniel, however, resigned from the service, and following an unsuccessful attempt at a career in journalism, disappeared into obscurity in South Africa.

== Post-Royal Oak ==
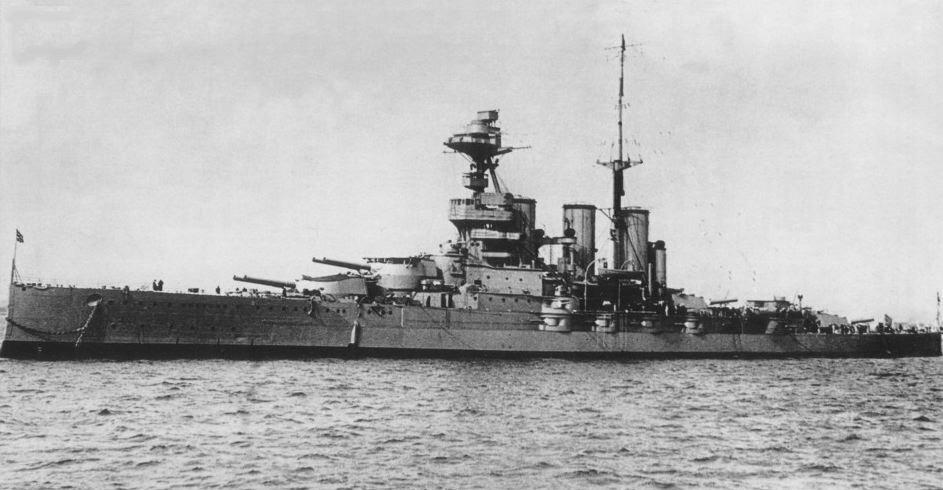
HMS Tiger after 1918 configuration, with mainmast ahead of third funnel.

Dewar was once more given duty at sea. However, he was to be relegated to second-rate commands for a man of his seniority. Much to the surprise of many, on 25 September 1928 it was announced that from 5 November Dewar would be given command of the battle cruiser Tiger, the oldest of her type still in service and engaged primarily in training. However, it demonstrated the Admiralty's continued, albeit conditional, faith in him. He commanded Tiger until he was given command of HMS Iron Duke the following year. On 29 May 1929, he was made a naval aide-de-camp (ADC) to King George V. However, Dewar's time in the Navy was drawing to a close. On 4 August, he was finally promoted to rear-admiral, and the following day he was retired. Promotion to flag rank also saw the end of his duty as ADC to the King. On the day of his promotion he was also granted the Good Service pension of £150 per annum.

=== Standing for Parliament ===
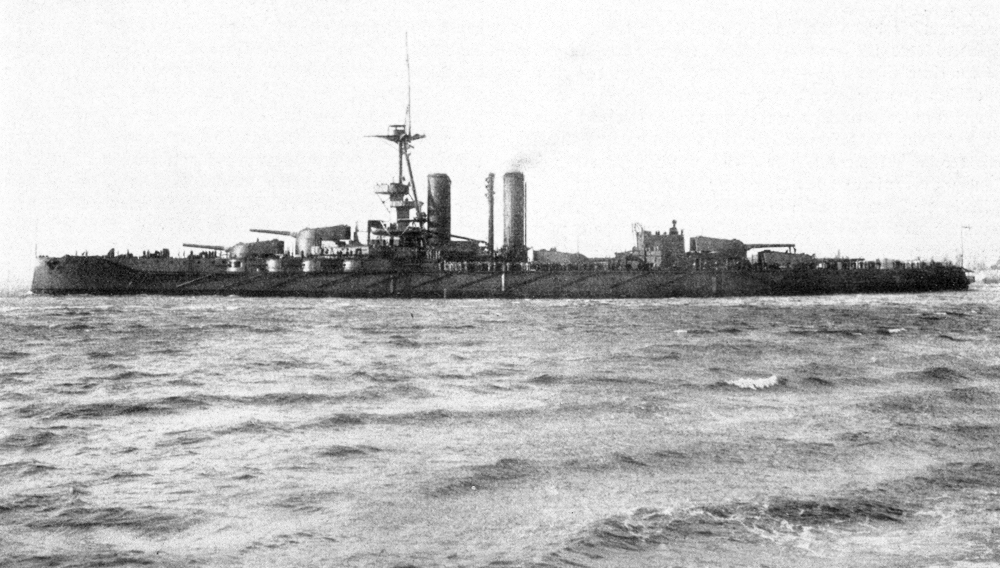
Iron Duke in November 1913

In the 1931 General Election, Dewar stood as a Labour party candidate in Portsmouth North, where he lost against the incumbent by 14,149 votes. Once more Dewar was unable to escape controversy, having put up posters around the naval city which raised indignation among many sailors and officers.

The posters, which Dewar himself called "propaganda sheets", were titled "Admiral Dewar's Election News", and carried the statement "The British Navy at Jutland in 1916 beat the ex-Kaiser; and at Invergordon in 1931 it beat Mr. Montagu Norman", and featured prominently a depiction of the former Kaiser of Germany in civilian clothing in front of a sea battle, with the Governor of the Bank of England, Montagu Norman, looking on. A notice beneath the picture read:

The ex-Kaiser tried to force German Kultur on the world. This attempt cost millions of human lives. Mr. Montagu Norman is the British head of the international financial system which tried to impose the pre-War gold parity on Britain. The attempt devastated British industry and brought desolation into thousands of working-class homes.

Dewar was accused of comparing Jutland to the Invergordon Mutiny, which rankled many servicemen who had fought at Jutland, but had taken no part in the 1931 mutiny in Northern Scotland. He claimed in his defence–a statement issued to the press on 29 October 1931–that he had had nothing to do with the design or production of the poster, which had been published by the National Cooperative Publishing Society. Later Dewar wrote, "I deeply regret that this picture should ever have been associated with my name." At this point, he had already lost at the polls by a substantial margin, the election having taken place on 27 October.

1931 United Kingdom general election
Party	Candidate	Votes	%	±%
Conservative	Sir Bertram Falle	26,331	68.4%	+71.5%
Labour	Rear-Admiral Kenneth Dewar	12,182	31.6%	+83.3%
Majority		14,149		
Turnout		38,513	74.4%	+8.5

=== Later life ===
As part of Navy Week in 1933 on 5 August, Dewar was invited to open a naval paintings exhibition at the Ilford Galleries in London. He took the opportunity to praise the Washington Naval Conference and the London Naval Conference 1930, and to criticise the size of the Treaty battleship. On the retired list of the Royal Navy, he was promoted to the rank of vice-admiral (retd.) on 31 July 1934.

In early 1939, Dewar's memoirs were published. In The Navy from Within, he recounted his life story, while at the same time criticising severely the manner in which the Royal Navy trained its officers, blaming defects in said training for the naval failure at Gallipoli. However, his account was criticised as being far too harsh and at points hypocritical, for after condemning the naval system of training he then made many mentions of naval officers whom he himself considered to be excellent. In a letter to The Times, Dewar complained that their reviewer was taking far too much issue with the author, which as the reviewer pointed out, "a review of an autobiography must necessarily deal largely with the author himself". Responding to a review of The Navy from Within in The Naval Review which questioned the prominence of "The Royal Oak Affair" in the book, Dewar responded by stating;

When the Royal Oak case demonstrated to the whole Navy that it was more than dangerous to make a complaint against a superior in accordance with the regulations, it paved the way to the Invergordon Mutiny and several minor incidents of the same kind, each of which might have been avoided if men had had faith in the statutory right of complaint.

Dewar, despite the attached stigma of the mutiny and criticism of his memoirs, was still held in high regard by many, and as war approached he wrote a number of letters to The Times criticising the cost of the Air Raid Precautions network, which attracted much support in the "Letters" pages in that newspaper.

During the Second World War, he returned to the Admiralty, working under his brother Alfred in the Historical Section of the Training and Staff Duties Division. After the war ended, Dewar would win one final victory when he sued the author and publisher of a book on Admiral Keyes for libel in 1953. In the book written by Brigadier-General Aspinall Oglander^{[g]} was a letter from Keyes to the King's private secretary, Lord Stamfordham, in which Keyes accused Dewar of having made contact with the press in his defence. Dewar denied this and the High Court of Justice agreed with him, finding in his favour. The solicitors acting on behalf of Aspinall-Oglander and the publishers, Hogarth Press Ltd., agreed to apologise in court and paid Dewar damages and expenses.

In 1957, he returned to his earlier theme on the failings of officer training, in a three-part exposition on the Dardanelles Campaign for The Naval Review, the journal he had helped found over forty years previously. In the concluding article, published in October 1957, Dewar wrote that the failure of the Navy to adequately support the Army at Gallipoli "is to be found in the system of training officers which consciously or unconsciously suppressed independent thought and suggestions from subordinates." Despite his later close association with Churchill, he criticised the former First Lord's unrealistic expectations and also Lord Fisher's inability to rein him in for want of a naval staff; and Admiral of the Fleet (at the time Commodore) Roger Keyes for actively trying to gain support for forcing the straits again instead of acting as chief of staff and only advising the Naval Commander at the Dardanelles.

Dewar was given the last rites on 8 September 1964 and died at his home in Worthing, Sussex. He was buried at St Bartholomew's Church, Rainhill, Merseyside on 12 September.

== Notes ==
a. The Inspector of Target Practice had been set up so that the Admiralty could have a gunnery officer other than the Director of Naval Ordnance capable to troubleshoot gunnery standards throughout the Royal Navy, and be of sufficient rank and stature to make their views known. His assistant(s) would be instrumental in observing tests and visiting ships.

b. Richmond went on to retire from the navy and became a widely respected naval historian, before assuming the Mastership of Downing College, Cambridge.

c. The Rear-Admiral in a battle squadron would in action command half the ships in a tactical formation called a division, and therefore required a small staff. In event of the Vice-Admiral being incapacitated, the Rear-Admiral would be expected to take active command of the squadron. Indeed, as senior officer in the squadron he would automatically be in command.

d. Keyes gave Collard the option of raising his flag in the battleship Resolution, but Collard refused. He was consequently relieved of his command by the Admiralty and ordered home on the 16th.

e. To be "dismissed his ship", in this case the base ship HMS Cormorant, meant being sent home in disgrace.

f. Calculated from the returns published in The Times for the 1929 United Kingdom general election and the 1931 United Kingdom general election. The Liberal Party declined to stand a candidate in 1931, which helps explain the massive increases in the Conservative and Labour votes.

g. *Aspinall-Oglander, Brigadier-General C.F. (1951). Roger Keyes: Being the Biography of Admiral of the Fleet Lord Keyes of Zeebrugge and Dover. London: Hogarth Press Ltd. p. 305.
