= Listed buildings in Rainhill =

Rainhill is a civil parish in St Helens, Merseyside, England. It contains 21 buildings that are recorded in the National Heritage List for England as designated listed buildings. Of these, two are listed at Grade II*, the middle of the three grades, and the others are at Grade II, the lowest grade. The parish was originally rural, and within it was a coaching stop on the turnpike road between Liverpool and Warrington. Following the arrival of the Liverpool and Manchester Railway in the 1830s, the settlements of Rainhill and Rainhill Stoops grew, and merged to become a dormitory residential area. The listed buildings include farmhouses and farm buildings, and large houses that have been converted for later uses. Associated with the railway are its skew bridge, a chimney base and the station. The other listed buildings include churches, a school, an ancient cross, and a water tower.

== Key ==
Grade	Criteria
II*	Particularly important buildings of more than special interest
II	Buildings of national importance and special interest

== Buildings ==
Name and location	Photograph	Date	Notes	Grade
Old Hall Farmhouse; 53.40659°N 2.76898°W	—	c. 1350	A manor house that developed over the following centuries and consisted of buildings around a courtyard on a moated site, only the great hall surviving, and that is derelict. There are traces of timber-framing, and elsewhere the building is in sandstone or in brick with stone dressings. Most of the windows are mullioned.	II*
Manor Farmhouse; 53.40553°N 2.75385°W		1662	Originating as a manor house, it was later a farmhouse, and then a public house. The building is in sandstone with a stone roof, and consists of a main block and a gabled cross-wing, with a 1 1/2 storey extension added in the early 18th century. The main block is in two storeys, and the cross-wing has three storeys and an attic. On the front is a 2 1/2 storey porch. The windows are mullioned.	II*
Wood's House Farmhouse; 53.41084°N 2.73891°W	—	1664	The farmhouse is in two storeys. The older part consists of a sandstone gabled wing with mullioned windows. The later portion to the left dates from 1707 and is in brick with a stone roof. It has a central gable and contains casement windows. Each part contains a datestone.	II
Smithy Cottage and Smithy House (part); 53.40517°N 2.75155°W	—	Mid to late 17th century	Originally a cottage and part of a house later converted into a single dwelling. It is in sandstone with a Welsh slate roof. The house is in two storeys and has an asymmetrical three-bay front. The windows are mullioned, and there is a gabled half-dormer.	II
Rainhill Cottage; 53.40399°N 2.74825°W	—	1676	A house in stuccoed brick with a stone roof in two storeys. It consists of a main block and a cross-wing. The cross-wing is the older part, it has a gable facing the road and has mullioned windows containing casements.	II
Greenshouse Farmhouse; 53.42406°N 2.77678°W	—	1707	The farmhouse is built partly in sandstone and partly in brick with stone dressings, and has roofs partly in stone and partly in Welsh slate. The main block is in two storeys with an attic, and contains two gabled porches. To the left is a lower two storey wing, and there is also a 19th-century single-storey wing. Most of the windows are casements, and there are sash windows at the rear.	II
Dean's Farmhouse; 53.40763°N 2.77561°W	—	18th century (or earlier)	The farmhouse is in brick with stone dressings on a stone base. In the centre of the entrance front is a two-storey porch with a round-arched doorway above which is a datestone. Its gable contains another datestone and has a ball finial. The windows are sashes, some with stone lintels and keystones, and some are horizontally-sliding.	II
Farm buildings, Greenshouse Farm; 53.42378°N 2.77669°W	—	18th to 19th century	The farm buildings consist of a threshing barn to the south, and a stable and carriage house to the north. The barn is in brick with some sandstone and contains a round-headed entrance and two oculi. The other building is built in stone, it is in two storeys, and contains a large opening with a keystone.	II
Loyola Hall; 53.40992°N 2.75173°W		c. 1824	Built as Rainhill House, it is in stone and has two storeys. The entrance front is in five bays and has a central porch with curved corners and a carved frieze. This is carried on six fluted columns and has an ornate iron balustrade. Flanking the door are niches with pointed arches, and above it are a cornice and a shell pediment. The windows are sashes with Tudor hood moulds.	II
Skew Bridge; 53.41690°N 2.76787°W		1828–29	The bridge carries Warrington Road (A57 road) (initially the turnpike) over the Liverpool and Manchester Railway, the engineer for which was George Stephenson. The bridge is built in red rusticated sandstone and consists of a single skew arch at 34 degrees with a span of 54 feet (16.5 m). It was widened in 1963 and a metal parapet was added to the southwest side.	II
Winding-engine house chimney base 53.41575°N 2.77674°W	—	c. 1829	The chimney base of the winding engine house at the top of the Whiston incline on the Liverpool and Manchester Railway was designed by George Stephenson. It is in sandstone, and consists of a pedestal in Classical style, with a square plan, and about 3 metres (9.8 ft) high. It has a stepped and moulded plinth, a dado with recessed panels, a moulded cornice, and a short square plinth on the top. The external angles have decorative horizontal grooving. On the upper surface is a circular flue hole about 5 feet (1.5 m) in diameter.	II
Milepost; 53.41691°N 2.76769°W	—	c. 1829 (probable)	The milepost is on the skew bridge and consists of a wide stone post with a round arched top. It is divided down the middle and is inscribed with the distances in miles to Warrington, Prescot, and Liverpool.	II
St Ann's Church; 53.41570°N 2.76390°W		1837–38	The original church was designed by Edward Welch, and largely rebuilt by him in 1843. It was enlarged in 1868–69 by G. H. Ridsdale. Welch's spire was removed in the middle of the 20th century. The church is built in sandstone and has a slate roof. The tower and the west end are in Neo-Norman style, and the rest of the church is free Perpendicular. It consists of a nave and chancel under one roof, aisles, a south transept, a west tower, and southwest vestries. The tower is in three stages, its parapet containing blind arcading, central clock faces, and corner pinnacles. The lychgate of 1915, and the churchyard wall are included in the listing.	II
St Bartholomew's Church; 53.40767°N 2.75095°W		1838–40	The Roman Catholic church was designed by Joshua Dawson, and the campanile was added in 1849. It is built in sandstone with an apse at the east end. At the west end is a Neoclassical portico with six fluted Ionic columns, a frieze, and a pediment. Along the sides and around the apse are giant Doric pilasters. At the northeast is an Italianate campanile with a low pyramidal roof. Inside the church the arcades are carried on large Corinthian columns.	II
Former St Anne's School; 53.41606°N 2.76473°W		1840	The Anglican church school was designed by Edward Welch, it was extended in 1848 and 1875, and partly rebuilt in 1884. The school is constructed in sandstone with a rendered slate roof, and is in a single storey. There are two main ranges at right-angles to Warrington Road. The ranges end in gables, and between them are three bays with a central entrance. The entrance and the windows are round-headed, and above the entrance is a cornice containing a plaque.	II
Farm buildings, Dean's Farm; 53.40740°N 2.77616°W	—	1842	A range of farm buildings in an L-shaped plan to the rear of the farmhouse. They are in sandstone and include a barn, shippons, stables, and a pigeon cotes.	II
Rainhill station 53.41709°N 2.76646°W		c. 1860–68	The station was built by the London and North Western Railway, and has Classical architectural features. It is in brick with sandstone dressings and has a hipped slate roof. The station is in a single storey and has a platform front of three asymmetrical bays. In front of this is a canopy carried on cast iron columns forming a nine-bay arcade decorated with latticework. The windows in the station building are sashes.	II
Briars Hey; 53.40686°N 2.76091°W	—	1868–70	A large house designed by William Brakspear with Gothic features, and later used as a care home. It is in sandstone with Welsh slate roofs, and has tall chimneys. The house is in an irregular T-shaped plan, and is two storeys with attics. The main front is in five bays and has a central entrance bay containing a pointed-arched doorway with an elaborate canopy. Some windows are mullioned, some are lancets, and there are two small gabled dormers. At the east end is a tower.	II
Water tower 53.40944°N 2.76419°W	—	c. 1870	The water tower is built in sandstone and has a flat cast iron roof. The top section and water tank have been removed. It is now in two storeys and has decorative Italianate features. The tower has a square plan and a shallow parapet. The main entrance and the windows are round-headed with keystones and imposts.	II
Men of Rainhill War Memorial Cross; 53.41558°N 2.76282°W		1920	The war memorial is in the churchyard of St Ann's Church near the northeast entrance. It is in red sandstone, and consists of a wheel-headed cross on a collared tapering octagonal shaft. The cross has cusped wheel segments and a moulded base, and the shaft stands on a tapered pedestal on a base of three steps. There are inscriptions on the north face of the shaft and the pedestal, and on the other faces of the pedestal are the names of those lost in the First World War.	II
Cross; 53.40744°N 2.76183°W		Undated	This is in stone, and consists of an old stepped base surmounted by a modern cross.	II
