= Rainhill Hall =

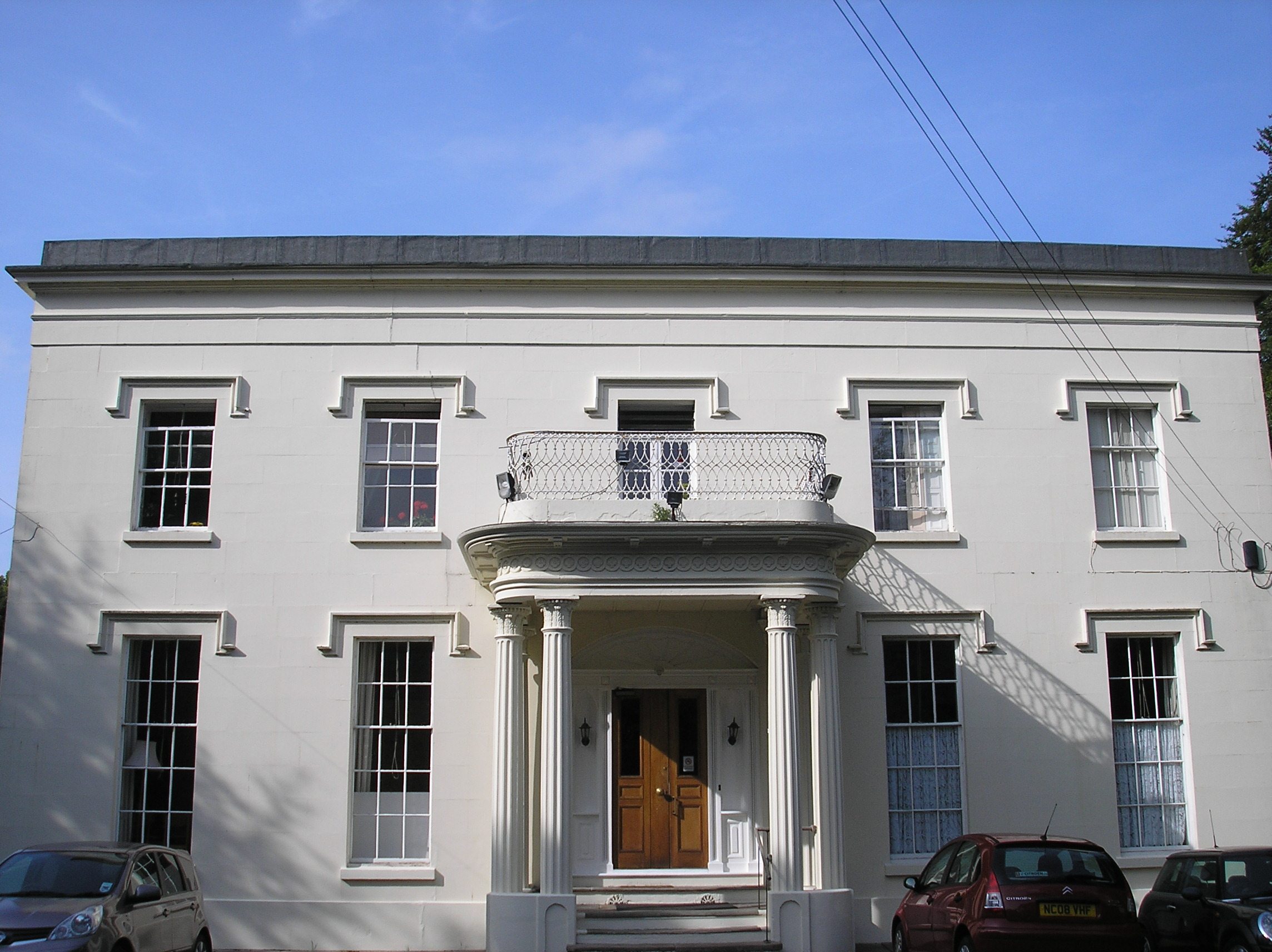
- Front entrance
- Former names: Loyola Hall

General information
- Status: Hotel
- Location: Rainhill, Merseyside, United Kingdom
- Coordinates: 53.409724°N 2.751872°W
- Completed: 1824
- Renovated: 1967; 2000; 2018
- Owner: Signature Living

Design and construction
- Designations: Grade II

Rainhill Hall or Loyola Hall is a Grade II listed country house built in the 19th century in Rainhill, Merseyside, England, by Bartholomew Bretherton. It is situated on the Warrington Road, next to St Bartholomew's Church. From 1923 to 2014, it was a retreat house run by the Society of Jesus. From 2017, it has been a hotel and wedding venue owned by Signature Living.

== History ==
=== Site ===
Bartholomew Bretherton started a business in coaches in 1800 in Liverpool. On journeys to Manchester or London, Rainhill was the first stop where horses were changed. In 1807 he came to live in the village.

In 1824 he built Rainhill House. In 1869, Mary Stapleton-Bretherton, his daughter, enlarged the house to over twice its original size, renaming it Rainhill Hall. When Mary died in 1883, the Stapleton-Bretherton family owned all the land that made up the parish of Rainhill.

As Mary was childless, she left the family estate to Frederick Bretherton, the only son of her cousin Bartholomew Bretherton, a former coach proprietor. His granddaughter Evelyn Stapleton-Bretherton married Prince Gebhard Blücher von Wahlstatt (1865–1931), becoming Princess Evelyn Blücher. Her memoirs, Princess Blucher, English Wife in Berlin (Constable, 1920) were translated into French and German and reprinted many times, becoming a minor classic.

However, his grandson Frederick, Evelyn's brother, had no direct heir, so Frederick decided to sell the bulk of the family's Rainhill estates. The house and five acres of surrounding land were sold to the Society of Jesus and renamed Loyola Hall.

=== Retreat house ===
The Jesuits took possession of the site in 1923. They moved from Oakwood Hall, a retreat centre they had in Romiley, in what was then Cheshire now Greater Manchester, into Rainhill Hall. The Jesuits named it Loyola Hall after Loyola, the birthplace of their founder Saint Ignatius. The first retreat took place on 23 June 1923. On 12 July that year, the Archbishop of Liverpool Frederick Keating came to attend a day of recollection and blessed the house. When Loyola Hall was initially founded by Fr George Pollen SJ, it more or less only ran 30-day retreats based on the Spiritual Exercises of Ignatius of Loyola and weekend retreats for working men's sodalities and parish groups. Numbers of retreatants continued to rise during the 1920s. In 1923 the total number was 504, in 1924 the total number was over 800, and in 1929 over 2,000 people had come on retreat during the year. In 1933, the director of the house, Fr Edward Rockliff SJ, expanded the grounds of Loyola Hall by purchasing twenty acres of land from the Bretherton estate to the north-west of the site.

After the Second World War, Loyola Hall began hosting RAF Leadership courses, under the direction of Fr Peter Blake SJ who was a chaplain to the British Armed Forces from 1939 to 1960. In the 1960s, individually guided retreats started. A new wing to Loyola Hall was soon built and cost £100,000. It was partially financed by the sale of fifteen acres of land for the construction of Rainhill High School. The new wing contained fifty rooms for residential visitors, a chapel (with stained-glass windows and sculptures by Jonah Jones), and a conference room.

Before it was opened, it briefly hosted the North Korea national football team. In the 1966 FIFA World Cup, the North Koreans made the quarter-finals but did not have any accommodation arranged near to Goodison Park where the match was being played. So they took over the booking made for the Italy national football team at Loyola Hall. However, the team were not entirely comfortable because they were not used to each person having a single room and, being atheists, seeing a large amount of crucifixes. Some players insisted on sharing rooms and many did not sleep well. They went on to lose the quarter-final match on 23 July 1966 against Portugal 5 - 3.

The extension was opened on 14 May 1967 by Archbishop Beck. On 22 January 1970, Fr Pedro Arrupe SJ, the Superior General of the Jesuits, came to Loyola Hall and planted a tree, which still stands in the front gardens of the house. In 1974, the stables, clock tower, coach house, and east lodge of Rainhall Hall were demolished allowing more space for retreatants to walk around the ground. In 1977, this was also helped by the acquisition of 'The Field', a strip of land to the north of the house, which acts as a separating space between the house and the A570 road. In 2000 it underwent a renovation, adding en-suite rooms, and the chapel was refurbished in 2006. In January 2009, it appointed its first non-Jesuit director, Ruth Holgate.

=== Hotel ===
Loyola Hall closed as a Jesuit retreat centre at Easter 2014, and was sold in 2017 to Signature Living who also own Crumlin Road Courthouse.

In 2018, planning applications were approved by St Helens Council to make the house a wedding venue and build treehouses and summer wedding facilities to the grounds, as well as add a restaurant, spa and gymnasium.

As of 30 June 2020, Signature Living, the owner of 60 properties in Liverpool, Cardiff and Belfast, went into administration. In April 2021, after a restoration, Rainhill Hall was reopened to guests by Signature Living.

== Building and grounds ==
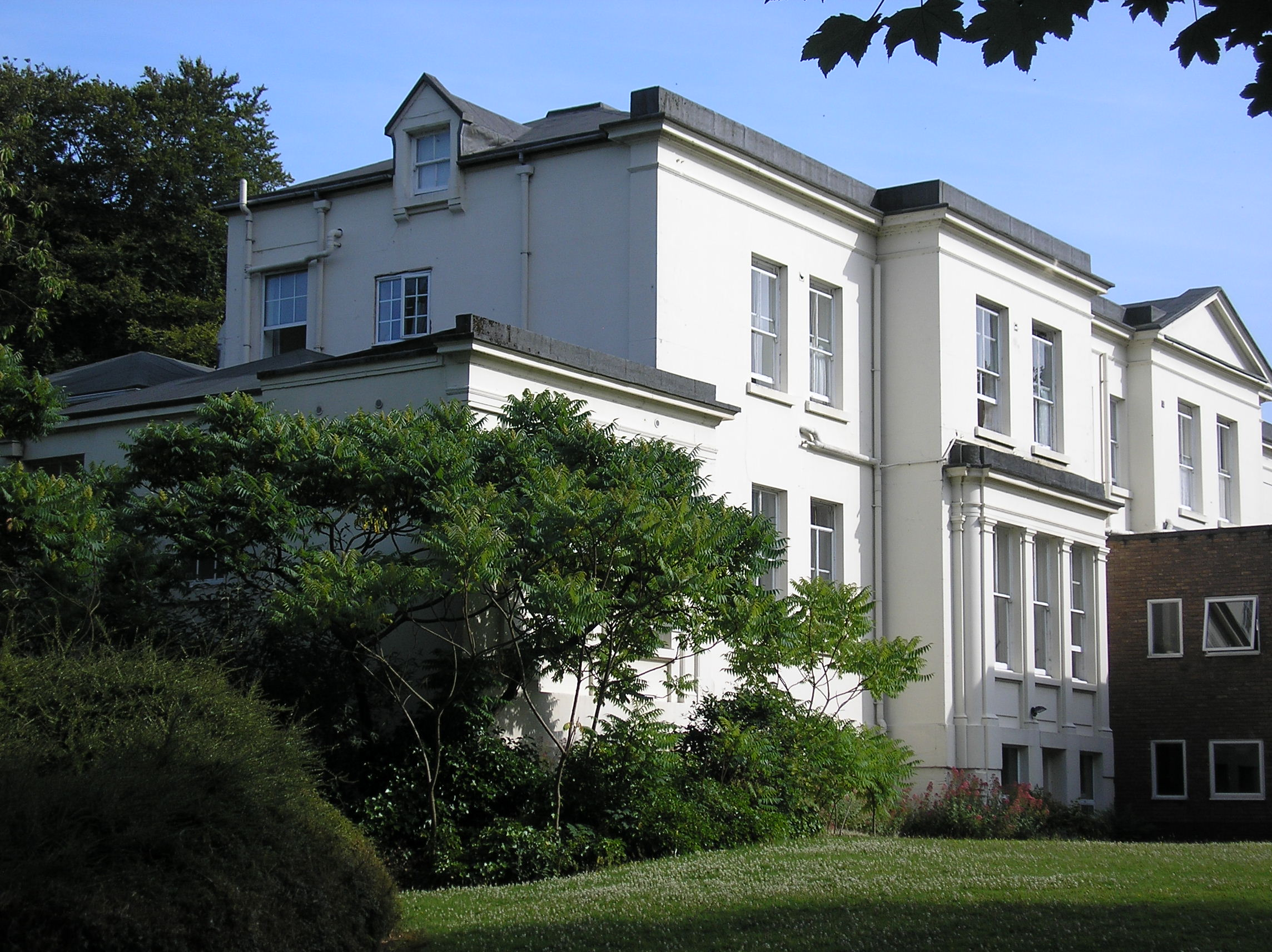
North west view of Loyola Hall

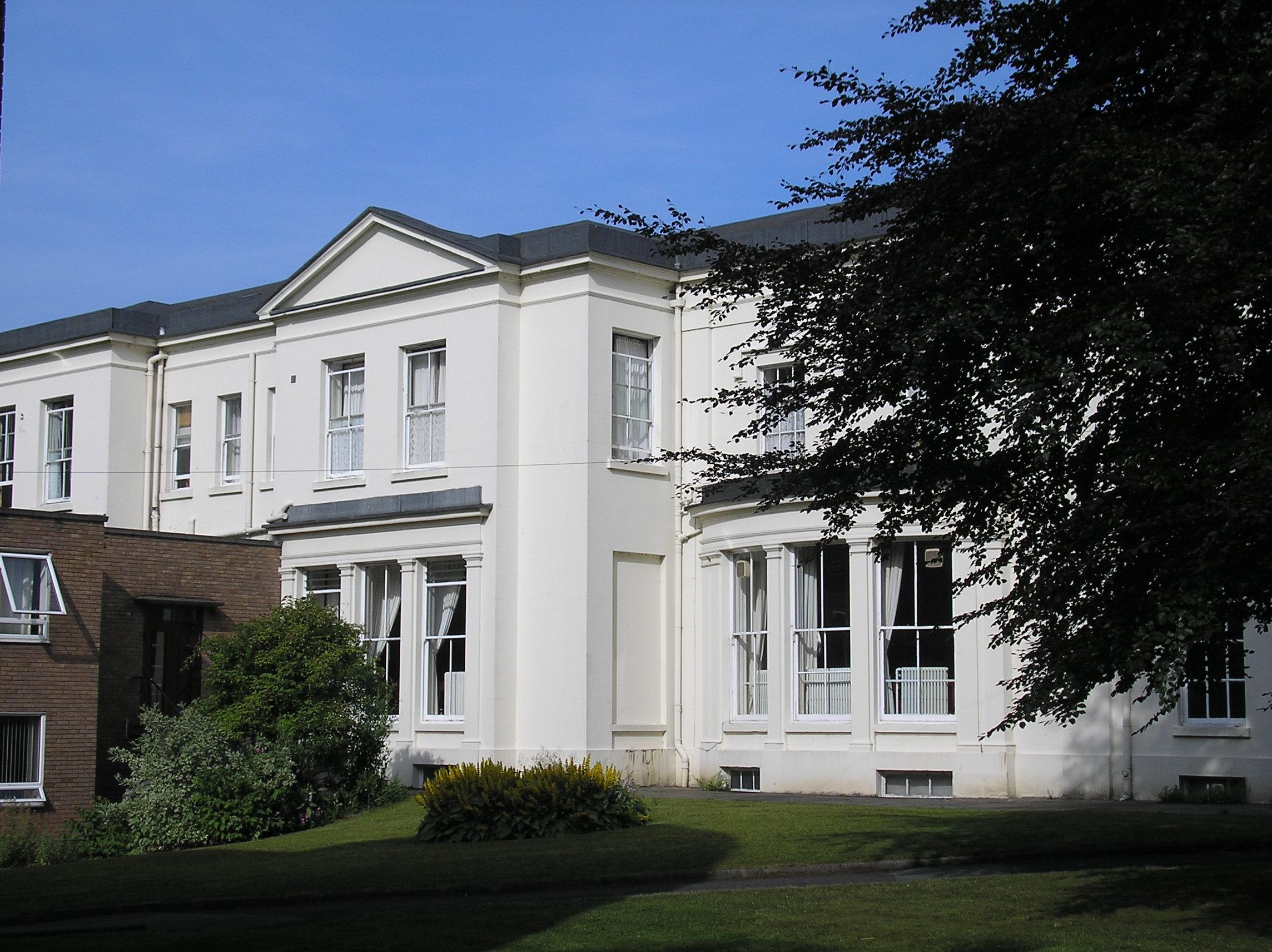
South west view of Loyola Hall

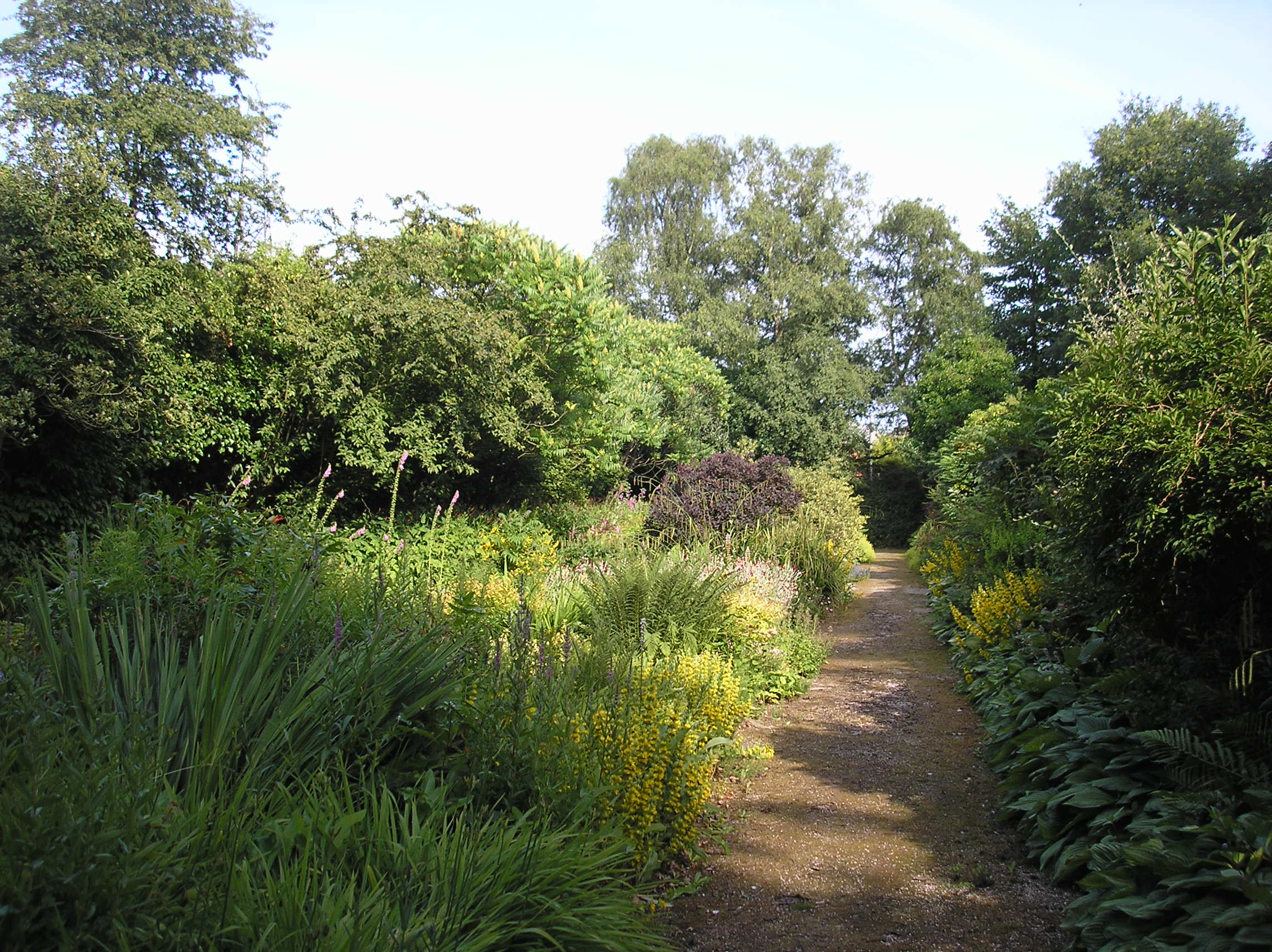
Garden path

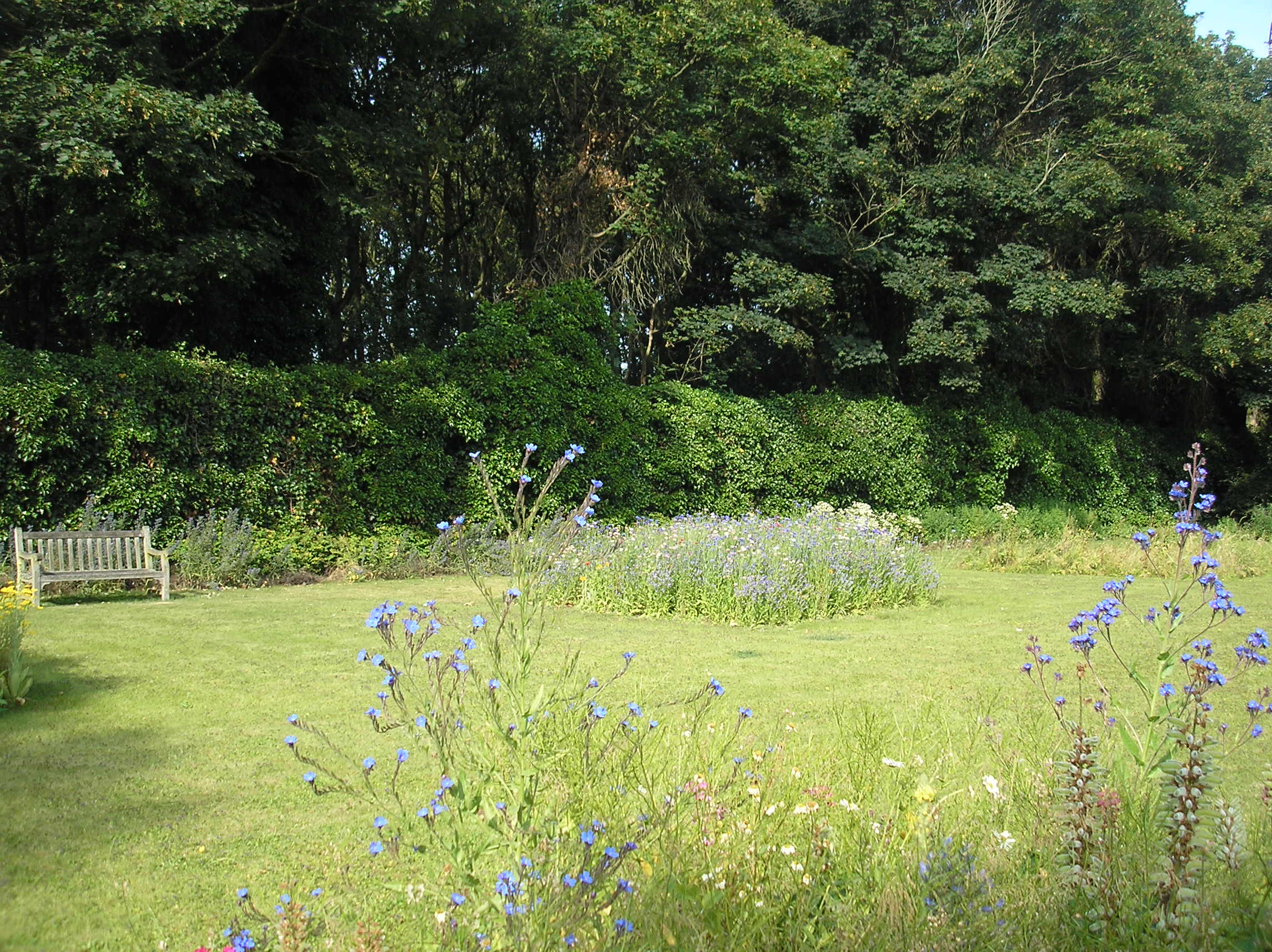
Garden bench

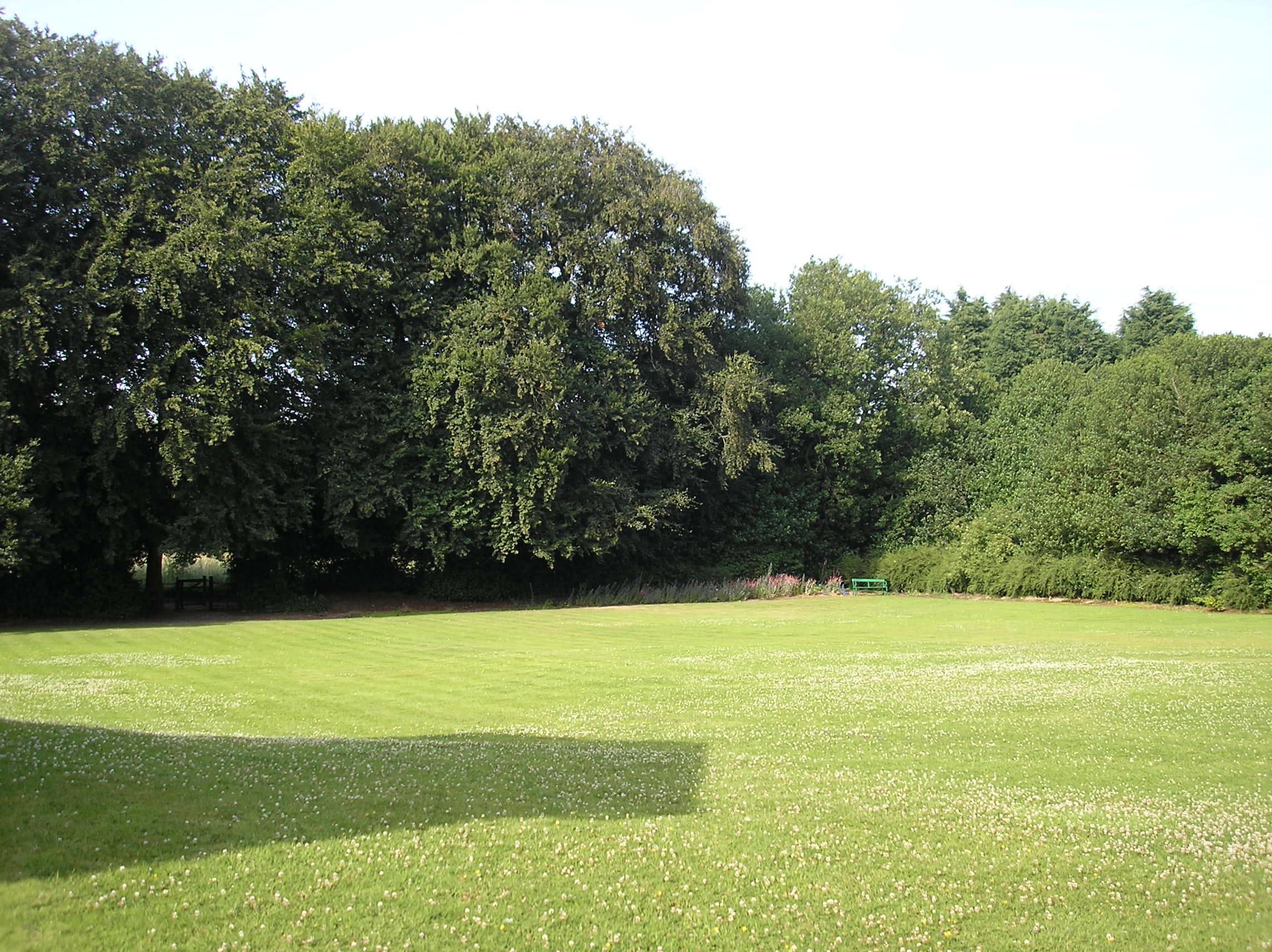
Small field

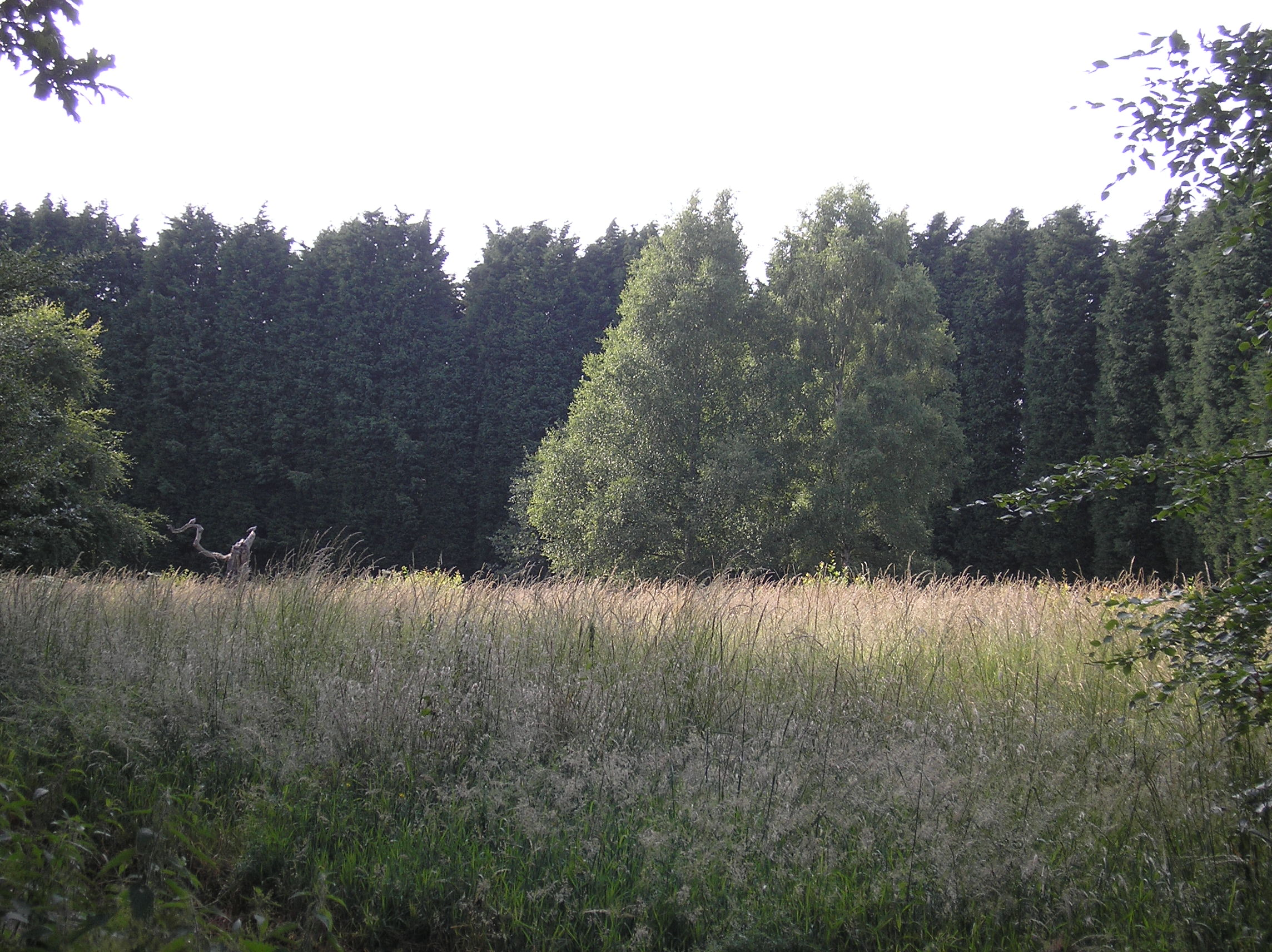
View west of the large field

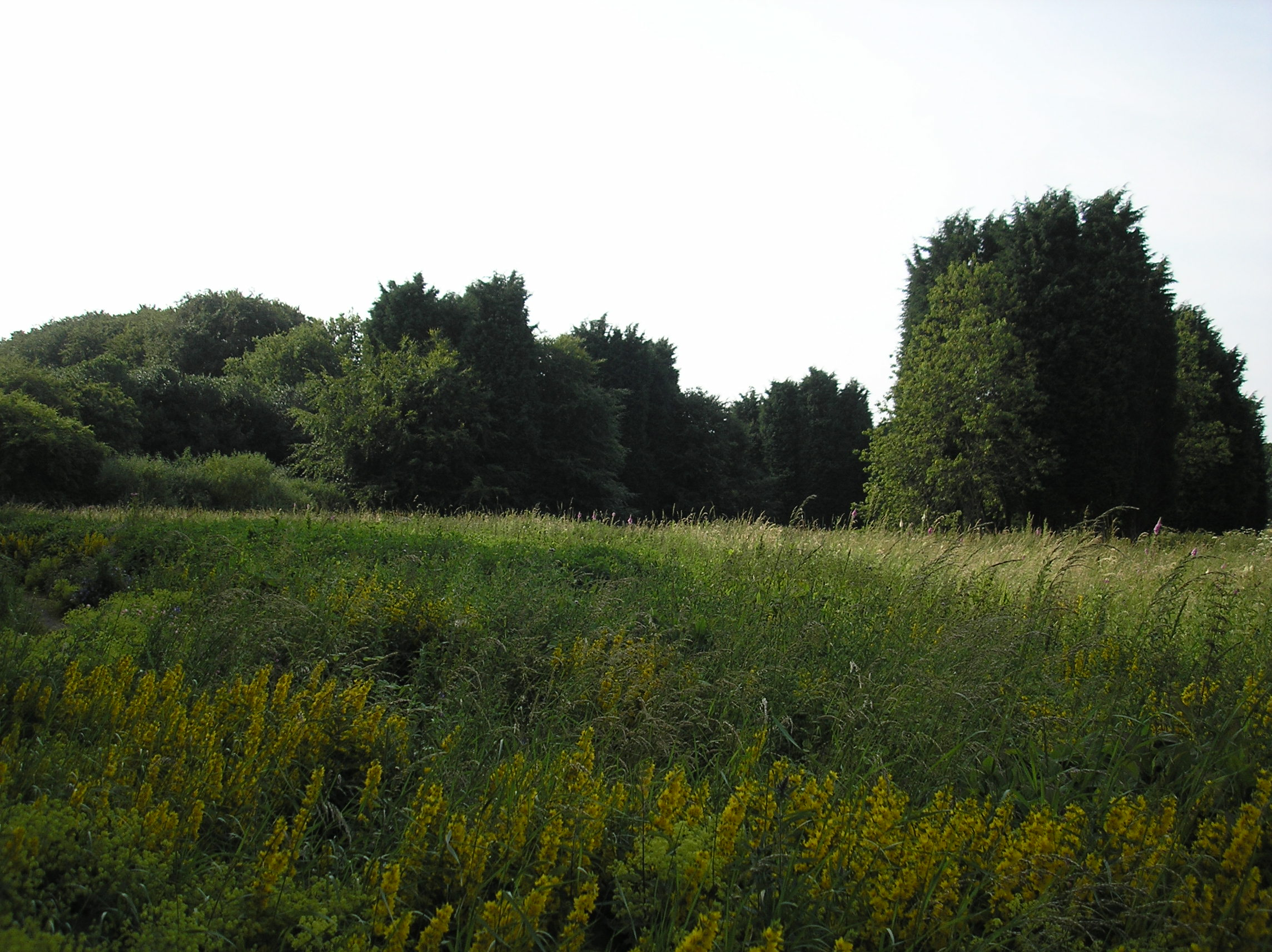
View north across the large field

== See also ==
- List of Jesuit sites
- Listed buildings in Rainhill
- Ignatian spirituality
