= Evelyn, Princess Blücher =

English diarist and memoirist

Evelyn, Princess Blücher von Wahlstatt
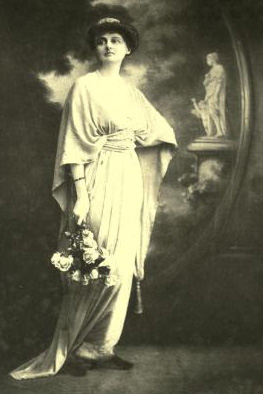
- Born: 10 September 1876; Brighton, Sussex, England
- Died: 20 January 1960 (aged 83); Worthing, England
- Education: Private
- Occupations: Diarist and memoirist
- Spouse: Gebhard Leberecht Blücher von Wahlstatt II.
- Parent(s): Frederick Stapleton-Bretherton and the Hon. Isabella Petre

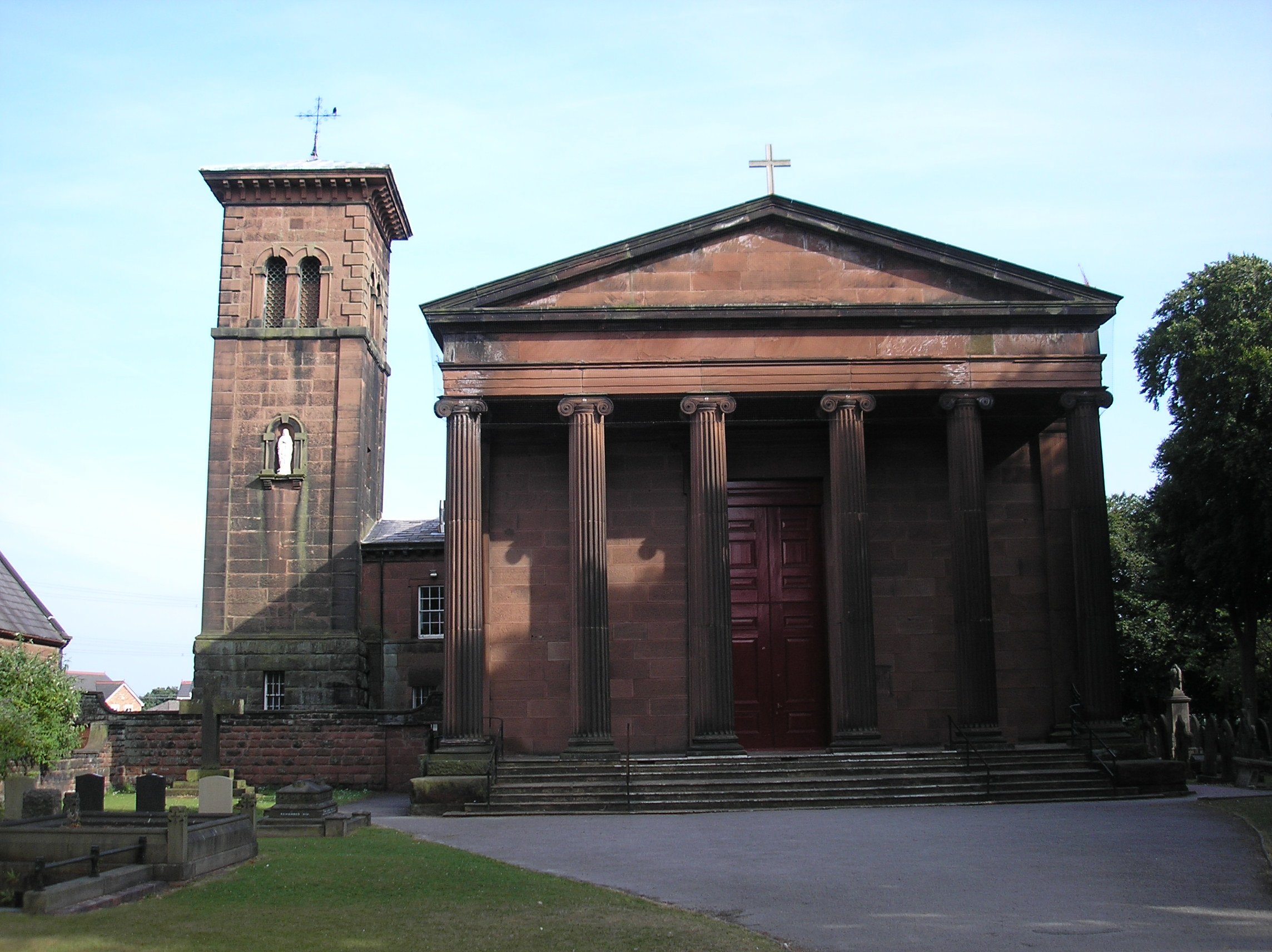
St Bartholomew's Church, Rainhill, burial place of Evelyn Princess Blücher

Evelyn Fürstin Blücher von Wahlstatt (10 September 1876 – 20 January 1960) was an English diarist and memoirist, who wrote a standard account of life as a civilian aristocrat in Germany during World War I.

== Early life ==
Princess Blücher was an Englishwoman, the daughter of Frederick Stapleton-Bretherton of a Catholic landed gentry family by Isabella, daughter of William Bernard Petre, 12th Baron Petre. They settled in Rainhill, Lancashire, living in Rainhill Hall. She was the great-granddaughter of Peter Bretherton, a coach proprietor, and a brother to the better known Bartholomew Bretherton, coach proprietor of Liverpool. On 19 August 1907, she married Gebhard Blücher von Wahlstatt, the fourth Fürst (Prince) Blücher (1865–1931), an Anglophile and tenant of Herm since 1889, descended from the great Prussian General-Field-Marshal Gebhard Leberecht von Blücher (1742–1819), the first Prince, who had contributed notably to the allied victory at the Battle of Waterloo in 1815. Her sister, Gertrude Stapleton-Bretherton, married Vice-Admiral Kenneth Dewar (1879–1964).

== First World War ==
Prince Blücher took a lease of Herm, the smallest of the habitable Channel Islands, but was forced by the British government to leave at the outbreak of war in 1914. He and his wife spent the War years in Germany, where he commanded a hospital train for the Silesian Order of Malta. Here the Princess kept a diary, describing life in Berlin and at the family estate of Krieblowitz in Silesia (now Krobielowice in Poland), from the point of view of an English exile among the deeply conservative Prussian nobility. This became the basis for her account of the war published as Princess Blucher, English Wife in Berlin: a private memoir of events, politics and daily life in Germany throughout the War and the social revolution of 1918 (Constable, 1920).

The journal remains a source of information on life in Germany during the First World War. During the cold winter of 1916/1917, she noted the shortages of fuel and food in Berlin which caused public morale, especially of the poorest, to plummet. Also described are the last weeks of the German Empire, with the decline of the old order, the fall of the monarchy, and the appalling social conditions that led to Spartacist uprisings and the German Revolution as the country became a failed state:

There is intense cold here, such as has not been known for more than half a century. There are shivering throngs of hungry care-worn people picking their way through snowy streets... We are all gaunt and bony now, and have dark shadows around our eyes. Our thoughts are chiefly taken up with wondering what our next meal will be, and dreaming of the good things that once existed.

Her memoirs were translated into French and German and reprinted many times, becoming a minor classic.

- Princesse Blücher, Une anglaise à Berlin: notes intimes de la Princesse Blücher sur les évènements, la politique et la vie quotidienne en Allemagne au cours de la guerre et de la révolution sociale en 1918 (Paris: Payot 1922)
- Evelyn Fürstin Blücher von Wahlstatt, Tagebuch mit einem Vorwort v. Gebhart Fürst Blücher von Wahlstatt (Munich: Verlag für Kulturpolitik 1924)

With Major Desmond Chapman-Huston, she edited her husband's Memoirs of Prince Blücher, describing his life and family, with an account of his great ancestor, Marshal Gebhard Leberecht von Blücher.

In later life, Princess Blücher returned to England, where she lived near the Brompton Oratory in Kensington. She died in Worthing in 1960 and is buried, next to her husband, in the cemetery of St Bartholomew's Church, Rainhill, Lancashire.

== See also ==
- Bartholomew Bretherton
- Mary Stapleton-Bretherton
