= Bartholomew Bretherton =

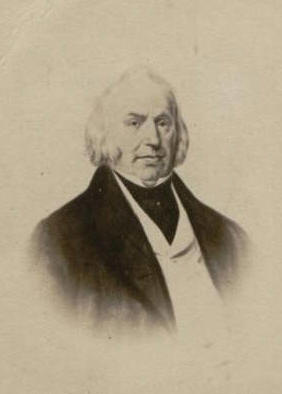
Taken in the 1850s by G.W.Griffin, photographer, of St Helens

Bartholomew Bretherton (c.1775–1857) was a coach proprietor and landowner who lived in Rainhill, near Liverpool. He founded St Bartholomew's Church, Rainhill and owned Rainhill House, which became Loyola Hall.

== Biography ==
He was born at Stonyhurst, Aighton, near Clitheroe, in North Lancashire, where his father is believed to have been a farmer In that area. Later he and his brothers moved to Liverpool. In 1799 Bartholomew married Jane Atkinson at the parochial chapel of St Nicholas, Liverpool. Although he was a Catholic, it was not legal to marry in a Catholic church at that time. On his marriage certificate, he gave his occupation as 'flour dealer'.

Bartholomew's brother, Peter (c.1770–1844) was originally a 'coachman' but in 1800 he purchased a coaching business, and soon after Bartholomew and his brothers Francis (c 1770–1833) and Joseph (c. 1781 – 1810) followed suit. Peter settled in Parr and his coaches ran from the Golden Lion in Dale St. Francis (c 1770 – 1833) lived at Maghull, where he owned stables and had a small coaching business. He had coaches (one called The Rocket) running from the Crown Inn, Redcross St and from the White Horse Inn, Dale St. Later Peter moved his business to the Birmingham area and settled in Yardley, Worcestershire. Joseph ( 1781–1810) lived at Sharples, near Bolton, Lancashire, where he had a small coaching business, but he was never part of the Liverpool traffic and died aged 29. Bartholomew operated from the Saracen's Head, Dale St and his coaches included Alexander, Bang Up. Lord Exmouth, North Britain, Defiance, Regulator, Royal Mail, Telegraph and Umpire. By 1822 he ran coaches to and from Manchester fourteen times a day and four left for London every day.

The first stage where horses were changed on journeys from Liverpool to Manchester or London was Rainhill and Bartholomew's first purchase of land there was in 1804. By 1807 he was living there and established stabling for 240 horses next to The Ship Inn. In 1824 he purchased a moiety (half) of Rainhill from James Gerard, a doctor. Soon after this he built himself a large house, Rainhill House (later it became Loyola Hall), and the beautiful St Bartholomew's Catholic Church in 1838–40. St Bartholomew's Church, Rainhill. Bretherton was an important and influential resident of Rainhill, and was very much involved in the Rainhill locomotive trials in 1829, the route of which ran across part of his land. The only entrant to complete this trial successfully was the Rocket entered by George Stephenson and his son Robert. He continued as a coach proprietor until 1843. According to Prince Blucher (who married Evelyn Stapleton-Bretherton, Bartholomew is said to have raced one of the first trains from Liverpool to Manchester, and beaten it by twenty minutes.

Bartholomew had two daughters, Jane (1805–1806) and Mary (1809–1883). Mary married William Gerard (1806–1844) (of the same family who had once owned a moiety of Rainhill) and later Gilbert Stapleton (1808–1856) but had no children. In 1869, she changed her surname to Stapleton-Bretherton. On Bartholomew's death in 1857, Mary inherited his properties. She enlarged Rainhill House renaming it Rainhill Hall (later it was sold to the Catholic Church and renamed Loyola Hall). In 1881 she purchased the second moiety of Rainhill, becoming a very wealthy woman.

Bartholomew is buried in the family vault under the church he built, St Bartholomew's in Rainhill.

== Family ==
Bretherton's brothers Peter and Francis each had sons who were also named Bartholomew Bretherton, – his nephews. They have often been confused in historical anecdotes. Bartholomew, the son of Peter, was a coach proprietor based in Yardley, Worcestershire. Bartholomew, the son of Francis, was a jockey, and lived in Maghull, north of Liverpool.

Bartholomew Bretherton (1806–1874) son of Peter, was his sixth child and fourth son who inherited the coaching business based in Yardley in the Birmingham area, from his father. This Bartholomew Bretherton married in Worcestershire in 1837 and had two sons, the older of whom was also named Bartholomew Bretherton (1839–1863). The younger one, Frederick (1841–1919) became the inheritor of much of the Bretherton wealth through his relative (first cousin once removed) Mary Stapleton-Bretherton (1809–1883), who was the only surviving child of Bartholomew Bretherton senior (1775–1857). Mary had inherited all of her father's properties and enlarged Rainhill House which later became Loyola Hall in 1923. She made the proviso in her will that to inherit, Frederick must change his surname to Stapleton-Bretherton, which he quickly did. His father, Bartholomew Bretherton, Peter's son, had lived in the Birmingham area until the mid 1840s but after the coaching business failed, he moved to Heyes House in Rainhill. In 1851 he was working there as a "house and land agent.' He was widowed in 1873 and died at his brother Joseph's house in Liverpool in 1874.

His granddaughter, Evelyn Stapleton-Bretherton 1876–1960, daughter of Frederick Stapleton-Bretherton, married Prince Gebhard Blücher von Wahlstatt (1865–1931), becoming Princess Evelyn Blücher. Her memoirs, Princess Blucher, English Wife in Berlin (Constable, 1920) were translated into French and German and reprinted many times, becoming a minor classic.

== See also ==
- Evelyn, Princess Blücher
- Loyola Hall
- Mary Stapleton-Bretherton
- St Bartholomew's Church, Rainhill
