= St Michael's Church, Ditton =

Coordinates: 53.3625°N 2.7610°W

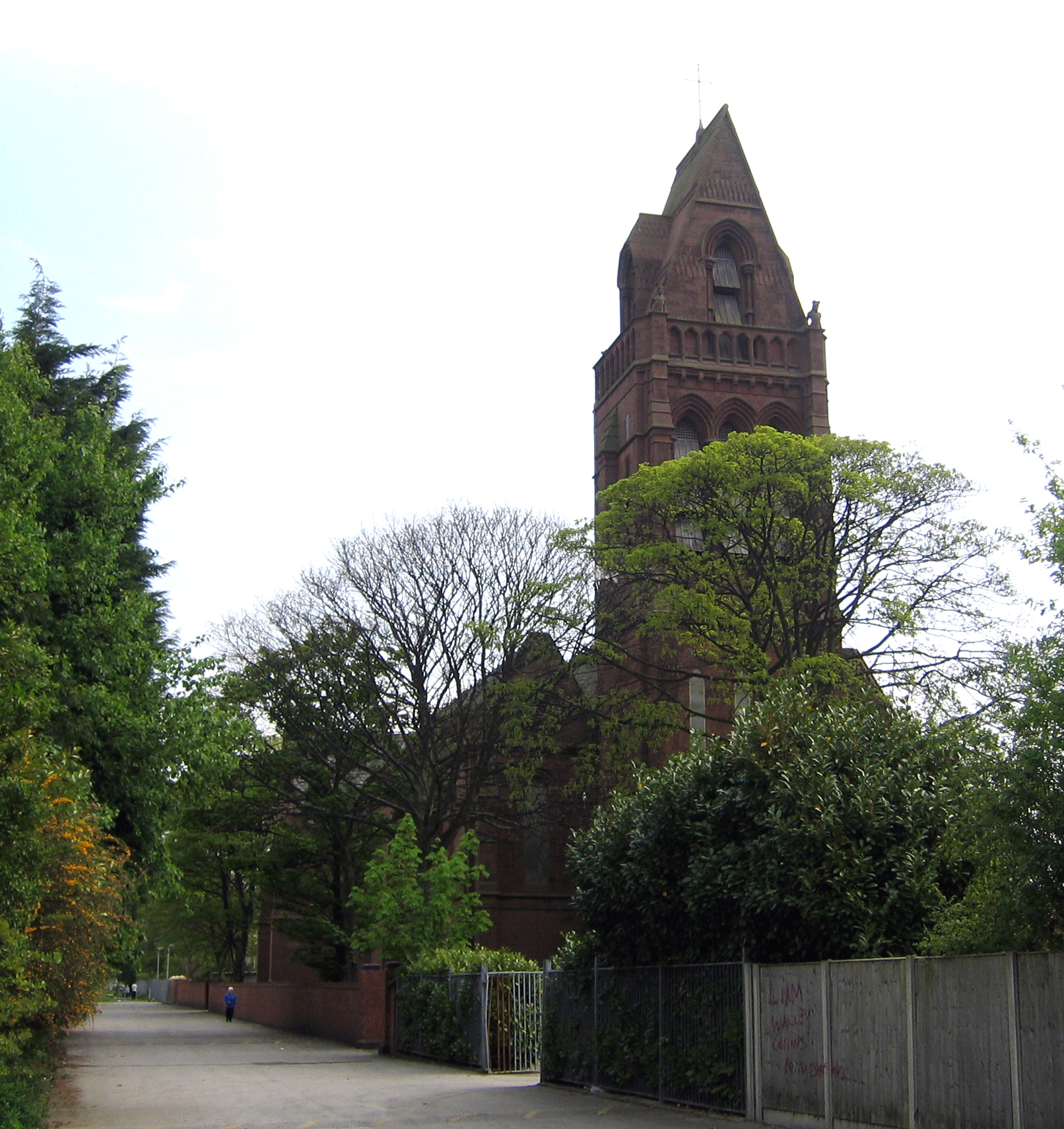
- St Michael's Church, Ditton, from the northwest

- Location in Cheshire
- OS grid reference: SJ 494 853
- Location: Ditton, Widnes, Cheshire
- Country: England
- Denomination: Roman Catholic
- Website: Parish of St Wilfrid

History
- Status: Parish church
- Founder(s): Lady Mary; Stapleton-Bretherton
- Dedication: St Michael
- Consecrated: 1876

Architecture
- Functional status: Active
- Heritage designation: Grade II*
- Designated: 31 October 1983
- Architect(s): Henry Clutton; Bartlett and Purnell
- Architectural type: Church
- Style: Gothic Revival
- Completed: 1879
- Construction cost: £16,000 (equivalent to £1,720,000 in 2025)

Specifications
- Length: 120 feet (37 m)
- Width: 60 feet (18 m)
- Materials: Red ashlar sandstone Slate roof

Administration
- Archdiocese: Liverpool

Clergy
- Priest: Fr M Moran

St Michael's Church is in St Michael's Road, Ditton, Widnes, Halton, Cheshire, England. It is recorded in the National Heritage List for England as a designated Grade II* listed building. It is an active Roman Catholic church.

== History ==
The church was founded when German Jesuits expelled from their own country (1872) settled in Ditton. They were victims of Bismark Kulturkampf which tried to reduce the influence of Catholicism in Germany. The Jesuit students of Theology formed a community at Ditton Hall and between 1876 and 1879 built the church. It was designed by Henry Clutton. The cost of the church, £16,000 (equivalent to £1,720,000 in 2025), was met by Lady Mary Stapleton-Bretherton of Ditton Hall. In 1979 the interior of the church was reordered by Bartlett and Purnell.

== Architecture ==
=== Exterior ===
The church is built in red ashlar sandstone with a slate roof. Its plan is cruciform, with short transepts and a west tower. It has an eight-bay arcade which takes in the nave and the chancel. The tower is in three stages with a steep saddleback roof. The entrance to the church is through the west door of the tower, above which are three lancet windows. Above these are three-light louvred bell openings and a balustrade. The windows in the gables of the chancel and transepts are rose windows containing stained-glass. Elsewhere, the windows are lancets. At the east end are two lancets separated by a large shaft.

=== Interior ===
The ceiling is barrel vaulted, boarded with hardwood, running through the nave and chancel. In the north transept is an organ and confessionals are in the south transept. The chancel has a yellow sandstone wall and a marble floor; the walls of the nave are plastered. The altar and lectern are made from Clipsham stone, and the stained-glass comes from Cologne. The organ was built in 1879 by Gray & Davison.

== See also ==
- Grade I and II* listed buildings in Halton (borough)
- List of Jesuit sites
- Listed buildings in Widnes
- Mary Stapleton-Bretherton
