= Rainhill railway station =

Railway station in Rainhill, Merseyside, England

Coordinates: 53.4171°N 2.7676°W

Rainhill
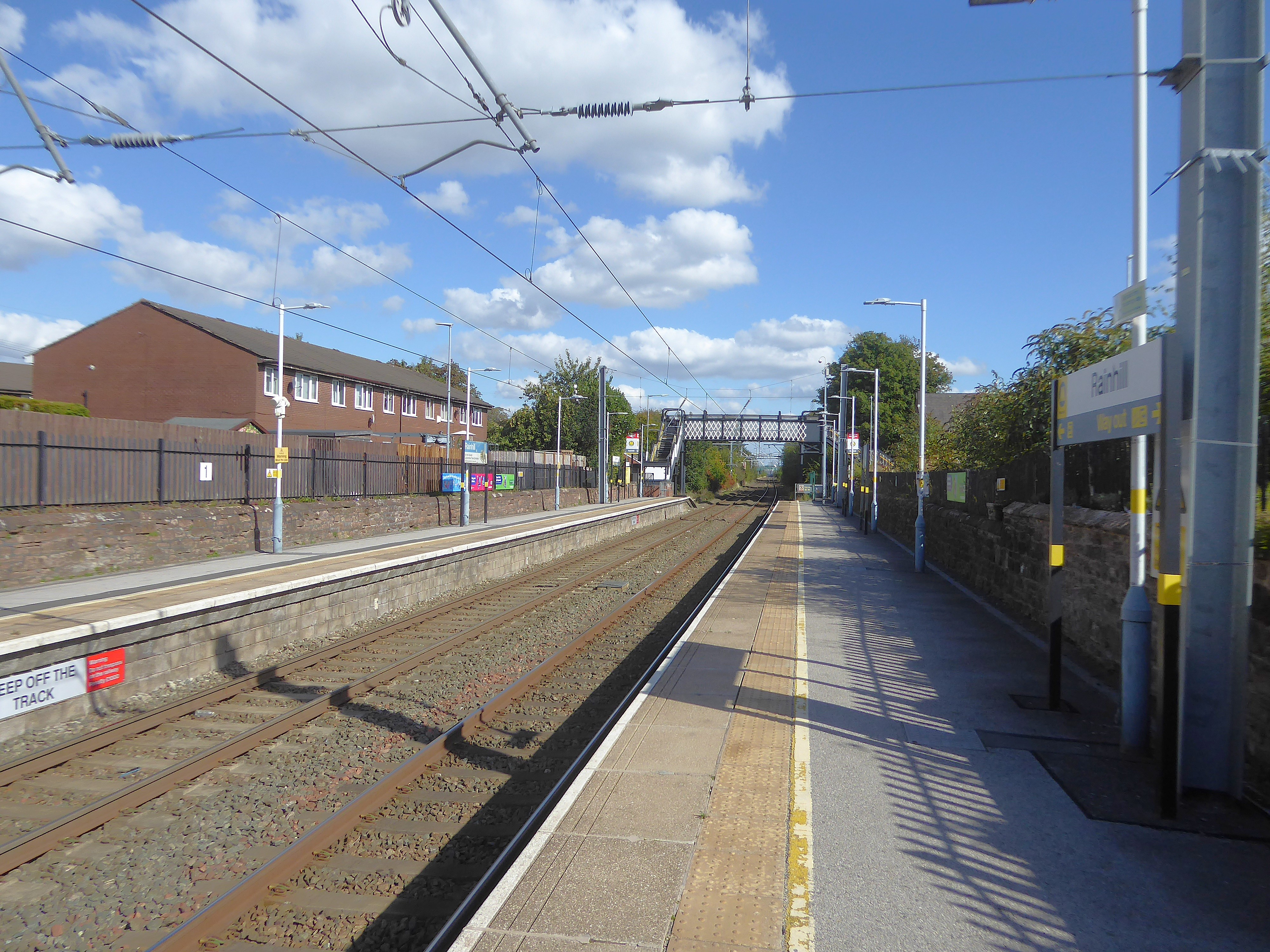
- Rainhill railway station

General information
- Location: Rainhill, St Helens; England
- Grid reference: SJ491914
- Managed by: Northern Trains
- Transit authority: Merseytravel
- Platforms: 2

Other information
- Station code: RNH
- Fare zone: A2
- Classification: DfT category E

Key dates
- 15 September 1830: Opened

Passengers
- 2020/21: ▼49,696
- 2021/22: ▲0.147 million
- 2022/23: ▲0.163 million
- 2023/24: ▲0.174 million
- 2024/25: ▲0.186 million
Location
Notes
- Passenger statistics from the Office of Rail and Road

Rainhill railway station serves the village of Rainhill in Merseyside, England. It is situated on the electrified northern route of the Liverpool to Manchester Line, forming part of the Liverpool City Line. The station, and all trains serving it, are operated by Northern Trains on behalf of Merseytravel and are branded as Merseytravel services.

Rainhill has an important place in railway history, as the location of the Rainhill Trials where the proposed designs of locomotive for the Liverpool and Manchester Railway were tested in competition.

== History ==
Rainhill station was opened in 1830 as part of the Liverpool and Manchester Railway, and is one of the oldest passenger railway stations in the world. These early intermediate stations were often little more than halts, usually positioned where the railway was crossed by a road or turnpike. This probably accounts for variations in the names of these stopping places. The station was originally called Kendrick's Cross or Kendrick's Cross Gate but this name did not last long; according to Butt (1995) it was changed to Rainhill in 1831, and according to Holt (1965) it was known as Rainhill by 1838 but not formally changed to Rainhill until 1844.

The station buildings are listed, they were constructed about 1860-68 by the London & North Western Railway, in a classical style, red brick, English bond, stone dressings, shallow hipped Welsh slate roof, modillion eaves cornice, single storey, linear plan.

At the western end of the station George Stephenson designed and had constructed a skew arch bridge to take the Liverpool-Warrington-Manchester turnpike across the railway. The bridge was the first skew to ever cross a railway and is now a listed structure.

== Facilities ==
As with most Merseytravel stations, it is fully staffed throughout the day (06:00 - 23:50 Mondays to Saturdays, 08:30 to midnight on Sundays). The booking office and waiting room is on the westbound platform, with a brick shelter on the opposite side and a lattice footbridge linking them. Digital information displays, help points and timetable poster boards are located on each side and there is step-free access to both platforms.

== Services ==
Rainhill is served by Northern Trains.

There is an hourly service to Liverpool Lime Street via Huyton, and an hourly service to Manchester Airport - on Sundays this service is extended to Wilmslow. There are two trains per day (Monday-Saturday) to Wigan North Western via Newton-le-Willows, and some peak hour services to Manchester Victoria. There is a service Monday-Friday at 09:56 to Liverpool which only calls at Huyton.

Services are generally operated using Class 323s & Class 331s, however during peak hours and on Sundays, some services are operated by Class 319s.

== Gallery ==
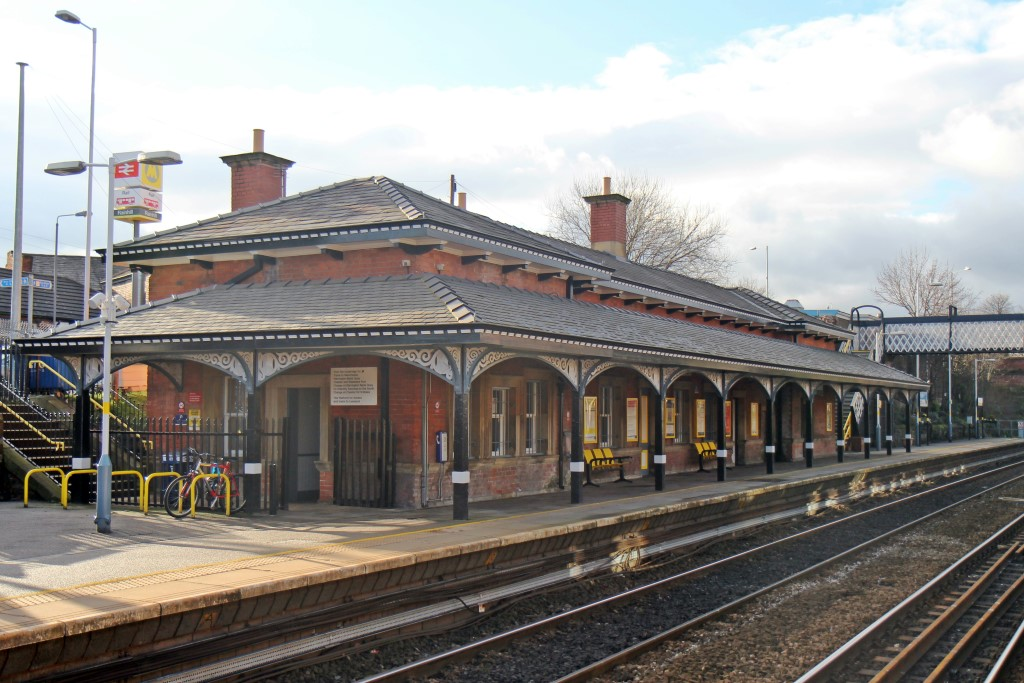
The station booking office.

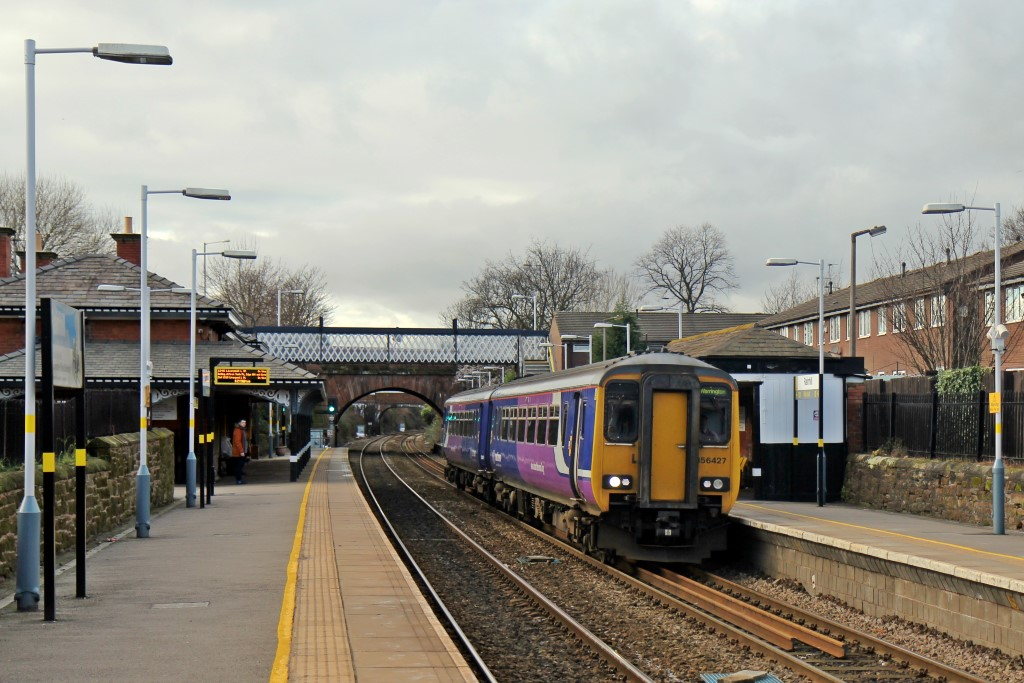
A Northern Rail Class 156 waits at the station.

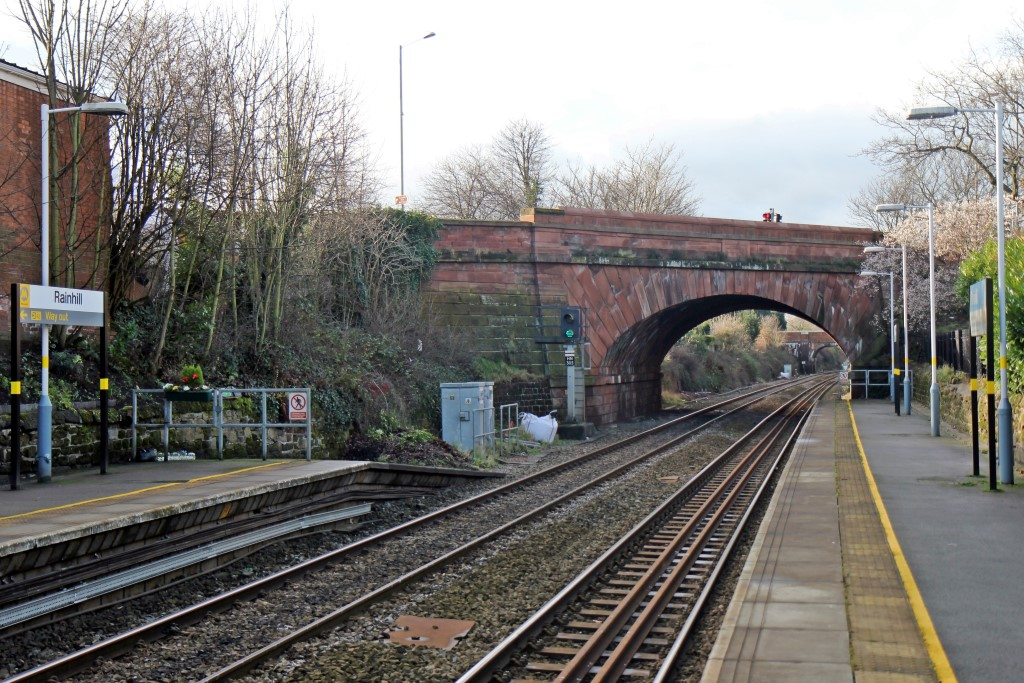
Stephenson's Skew Bridge.

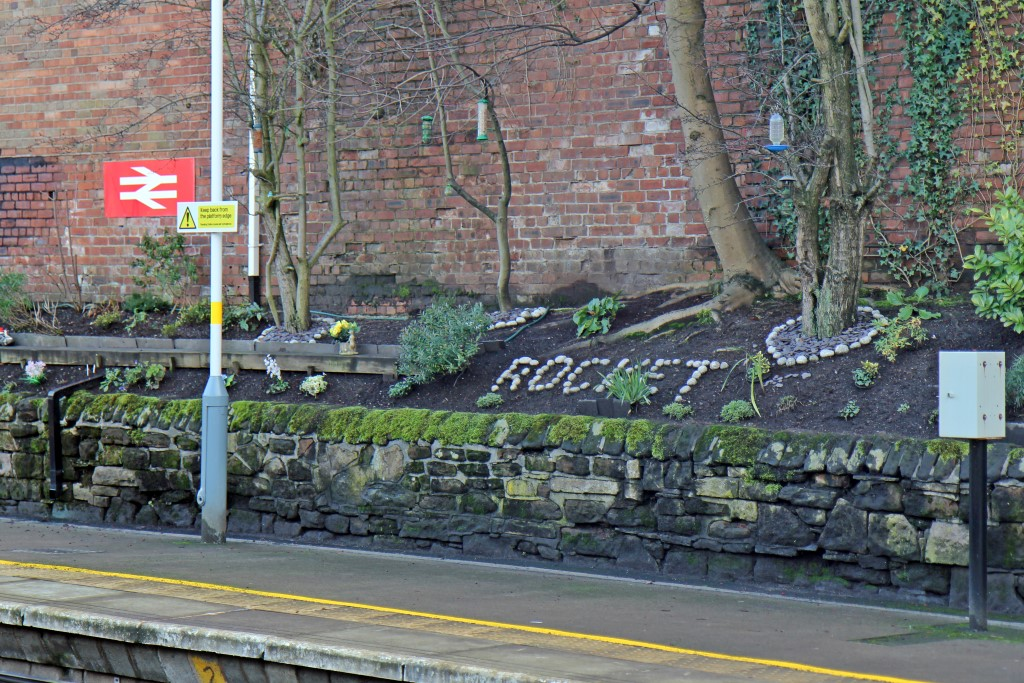
The "Rocket" garden.

== See also ==
- Listed buildings in Rainhill

== Sources ==
- Jowett, Alan (March 1989). Jowett's Railway Atlas of Great Britain and Ireland: From Pre-Grouping to the Present Day (1st ed.). Sparkford: Patrick Stephens Ltd. ISBN 978-1-85260-086-0. OCLC 22311137.

Preceding station	National Rail	Following station
Whiston	Northern Trains; Liverpool to Manchester Line	Lea Green
