= St Bartholomew's Church, Rainhill =

Coordinates: 53.4076°N 2.7509°W

St Bartholomew's Church
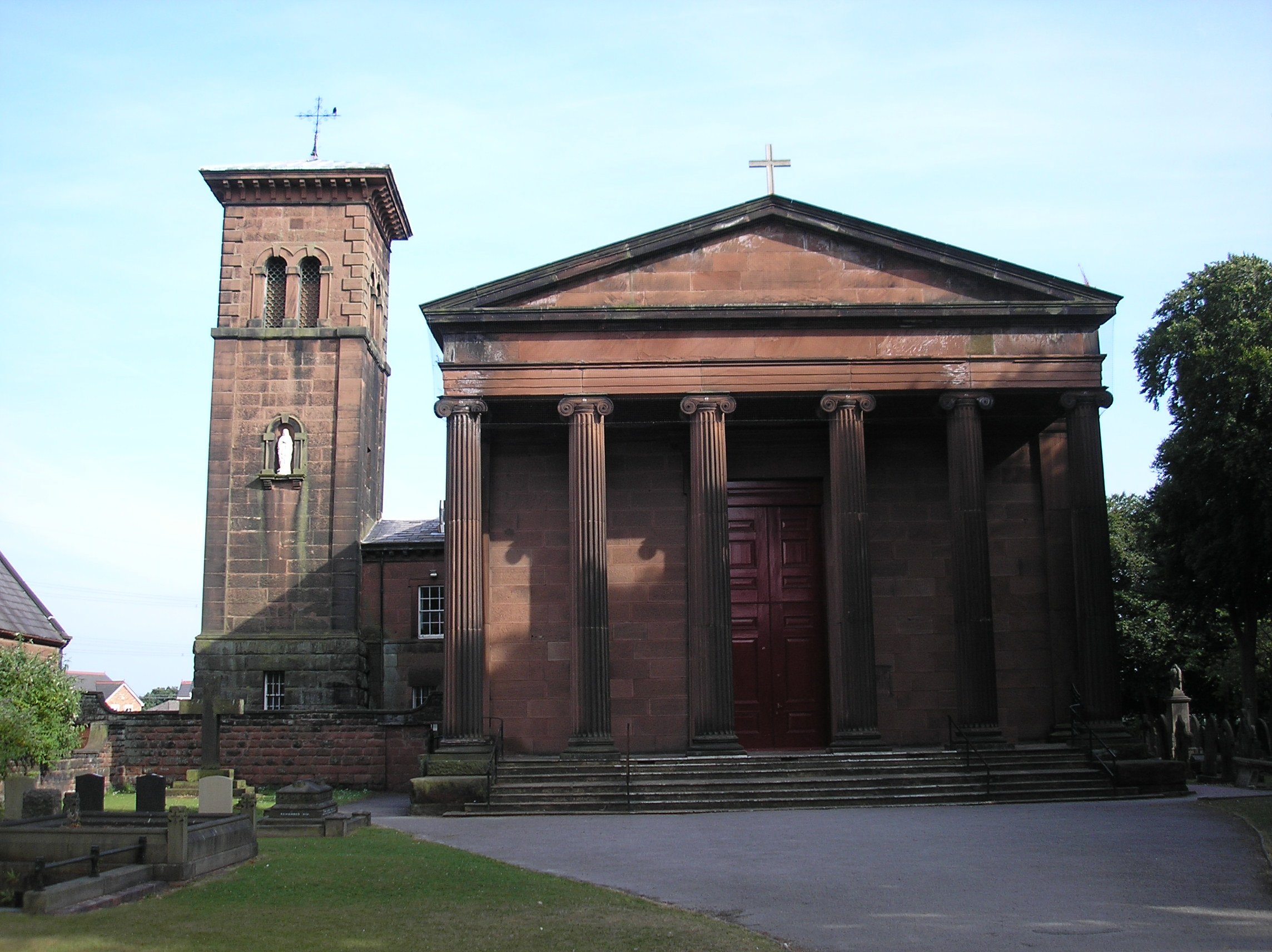
- Front entrance

- Location in Merseyside
- OS grid reference: SJ 50178 90352
- Location: Rainhill, Merseyside
- Country: England
- Denomination: Roman Catholic

History
- Status: Active
- Founder: Bartholomew Bretherton
- Dedication: Saint Bartholomew
- Consecrated: 24 August 1840

Architecture
- Functional status: Parish church
- Heritage designation: Grade II listed
- Designated: 28 January 1971
- Architect: Joshua Dawson
- Groundbreaking: April 1838
- Construction cost: £8,000

Administration
- Province: Liverpool
- Archdiocese: Liverpool
- Deanery: St Helens (St Monica)

St Bartholomew's Church is a Roman Catholic parish church in Rainhill, Merseyside. It was built in 1838–40 in the style of the Church of San Bartholomew on the Island in Rome. Grade II listed, it is situated on the A57 Warrington Road, opposite Rainhill Hall and was described by Nikolaus Pevsner as 'The noblest Catholic church in South Lancashire'.

== History ==
=== Origin ===
The church was founded by Bartholomew Bretherton (d. 1857) who was the owner of the family coaching business and main landowner in Rainhill. He lived at Rainhill Hall (opposite the church and known as Loyola Hall from 1923 until 2014 when occupied by the Jesuits). As well as being a business and landowner, he was also uncle of Bartholomew Bretherton (1812-1866) a winner of the Grand National in 1840.

Before it was built, the Catholics in Rainhill had to travel to the Jesuit church in Prescot, Our Lady Help of Christians Church or St Bede's Church in Widnes.

=== Construction ===
Bartholomew Bretherton chose the location where the church would be built, on the Warrington Road, in direct sight of anyone travelling down the main road through the village. He also chose the design for the church and wanted it to be dedicated to his own patron saint, Saint Bartholomew. The design he chose was by a local architect, Joshua Dawson. The architect went to Rome to look at the Church of San Bartolomeo all'Isola there. In 1838, building started and the stones were taken from a local quarry that the Bretherton family owned. The foundation stone was laid by Bartholomew Bretherton's daughter, Mrs Mary Gerard in April 1838.

The building was completed two years later. The total cost was £8,000 and it was formally opened and consecrated on 24 August by the Vicar Apostolic of the Lancashire District, George Hilary Brown.

Nine years later, in 1849, an Italian-style Bell tower was added to the side of the church. Bartholomew's daughter, Mary, added a lady chapel or chantry in 1845 in memory of her first husband, William Gerard of New Hall, Ashton-in-Makerfield. Other additions were also made in later years, notably, the imposing sandstone gateway to the grounds and the surrounding walls. Mary, her parents and Mary's two husbands are all interred in the church.

== Parish ==
Surrounding the church is a cemetery. Buried there are the members of the Stapleton-Bretherton family who owned the surrounding land and Rainhill Hall. They include Evelyn, Princess Blücher (1876-1960) and her husband Prince Gebhard Blücher von Wahlstatt (1865-1931), a descendant of General-Field-Marshal Gebhard Leberecht von Blücher (1742–1819) who commanded the Prussian Army at the Battle of Waterloo in 1815.

Also buried in the church cemetery is Kenneth Dewar (1879–1964) who was a vice-admiral in the Royal Navy. He was married to Gertrude Stapleton-Bretherton, Evelyn's sister.

The church shares a priest with the nearby St Theresa of the Child Jesus Church in Sutton Manor. St Bartholomew's has Sunday Mass at 5:15 pm on Saturday and at 9:30 am on Sunday. It also has Masses at 10:00 am on Tuesday and Thursday. Accordingly, St Theresa's Mass times do not conflict. They are on Sundays at 11:00 am and on Mondays, Wednesdays and Fridays at 12 pm.

The church featured episodes of Channel 4 soap opera Hollyoaks. There was a marriage ceremony and a funeral filmed there.

== Exterior and grounds ==
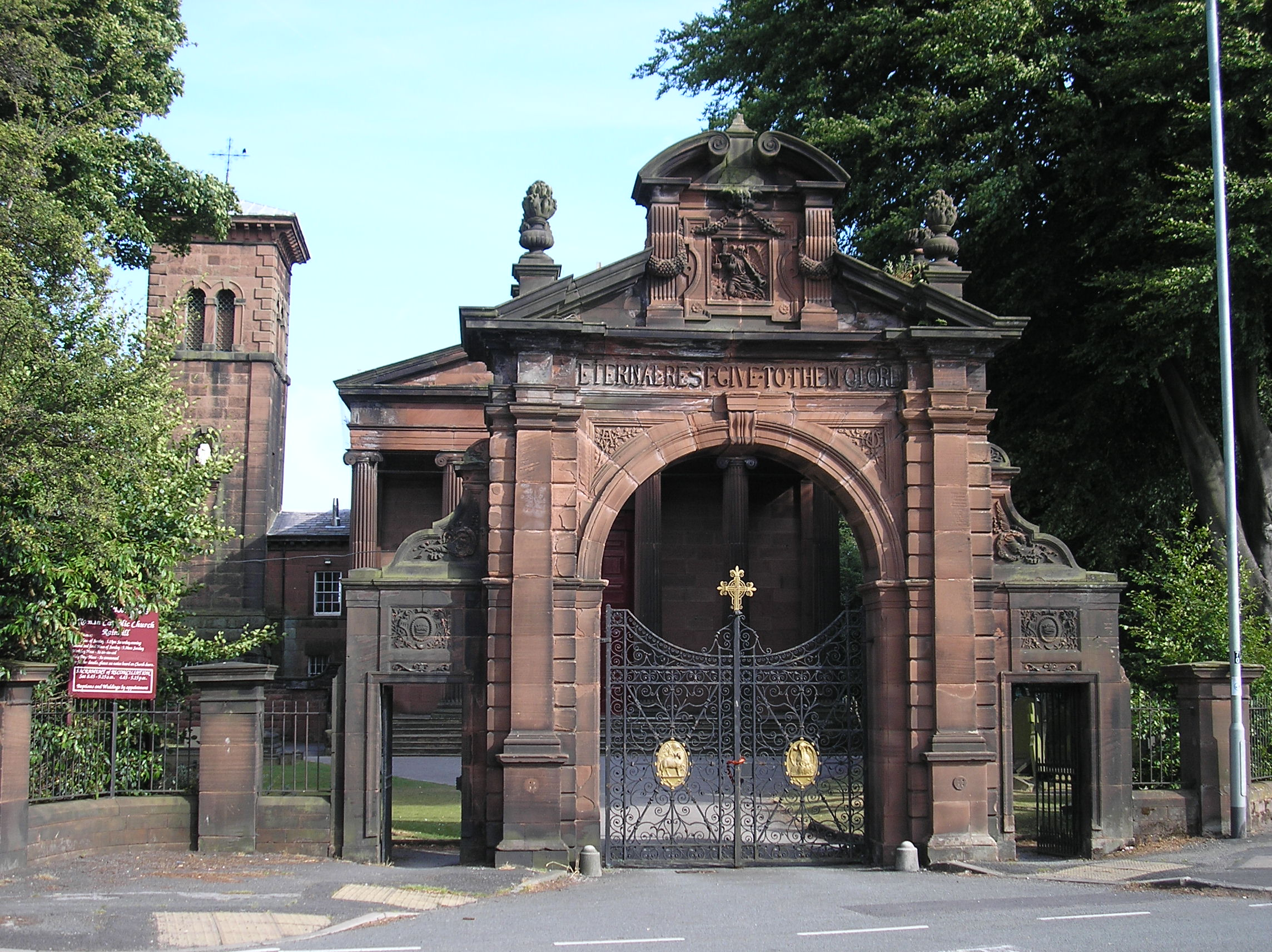
Gate

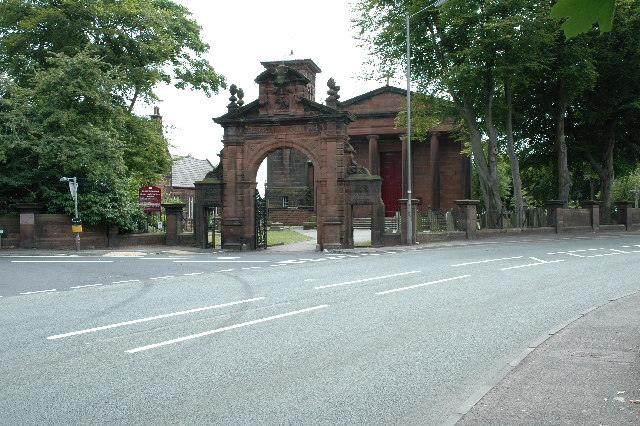
View from Warrington Road

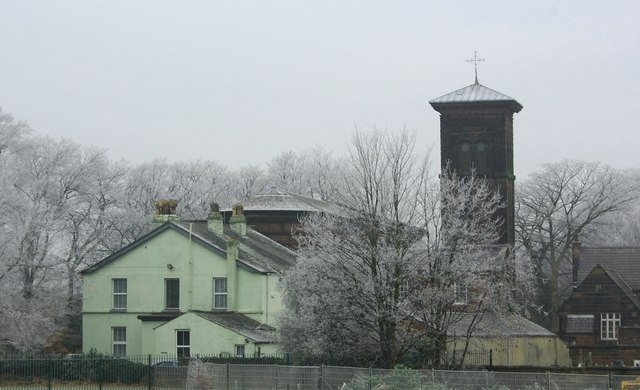
View from St Bartholomew's Primary School playing field

== See also ==
- Listed buildings in Rainhill
- Mary Stapleton-Bretherton
