= Rainhill High School =

Location
- Warrington Road; Rainhill; St Helens, Merseyside, L35 6NY; England
- 53.407934°N 2.750831°W

Information
- Type: Academy
- Established: 1987
- Local authority: St Helens
- Trust: Stephenson Mulit-Academy Trust
- Department for Education URN: 144326 Tables
- Ofsted: Reports
- Headteacher: Josie Thorogood
- Gender: Coeducational
- Age: 11 to 18
- Enrolment: 1,794
- Houses
- Colour
- Website: rainhillhighschool.org.uk

Rainhill High School is a coeducational secondary school and sixth form located in Rainhill, Merseyside, England.

The school is the official Liverpool F.C. Academy Education Centre in Merseyside for under-18 players. Notable former pupils from the academy include Raheem Sterling and Trent Alexander-Arnold, as well as Jordon Ibe, Jordan Rossiter, Lloyd Jones and Jerome Sinclair, the youngest player in Liverpool's history. The school has recently partnered with FA FE to strengthen post-16 education for the players. FE FA is owned and run by Robbie Fowler, former Liverpool and England footballer.

== History ==
On 28 and 30 March 2017 the NASUWT teachers' union began 14 days of discontinuous strike action. NASUWT representatives said the strike action was due to "unacceptable management practices by the employer toward teachers taking part in an ongoing national dispute over excessive workload". They added that management had "failed to attend meetings" to discuss the "intimidation being experienced by staff taking part in action short of strike action at the school".

The school converted to an academy under Rainhill Learning Village in March 2017. More recently, the school has become part of the Stephenson Trust. It is the lead school in this academy trust. It is an oversubscribed high school. Every year the school received in excess of 600 applications for entry into Year 7. The school has responded to its significant popularity by increasing its pupil admission number, from September 2017, from 240 entry into Year 7 to 300. By September 2021, there were expected to be 1,500 11–16 year olds plus the Sixth Form students on the site.

In March 2020, the school was placed on lockdown after a pupil was stabbed.

In addition to Liverpool FC, it has formal partnerships with Liverpool Institute for Performing Arts, Liverpool John Moores University and University of Leeds.

There is a strong academic curriculum that reflects the high number of high performing students at the school. Students can choose from over 20 GCSEs. There are different pathways at GCSE, and also at Key Stage 3 to reflect students' needs. Visual and Performing Arts, as well as PE are particular strengths of the school. This is reflected in excellent exam results as well as the array of curricular enrichment activities.
