= Rainhill =

Coordinates: 53.41566°N 2.76253°W

- Village and civil parish
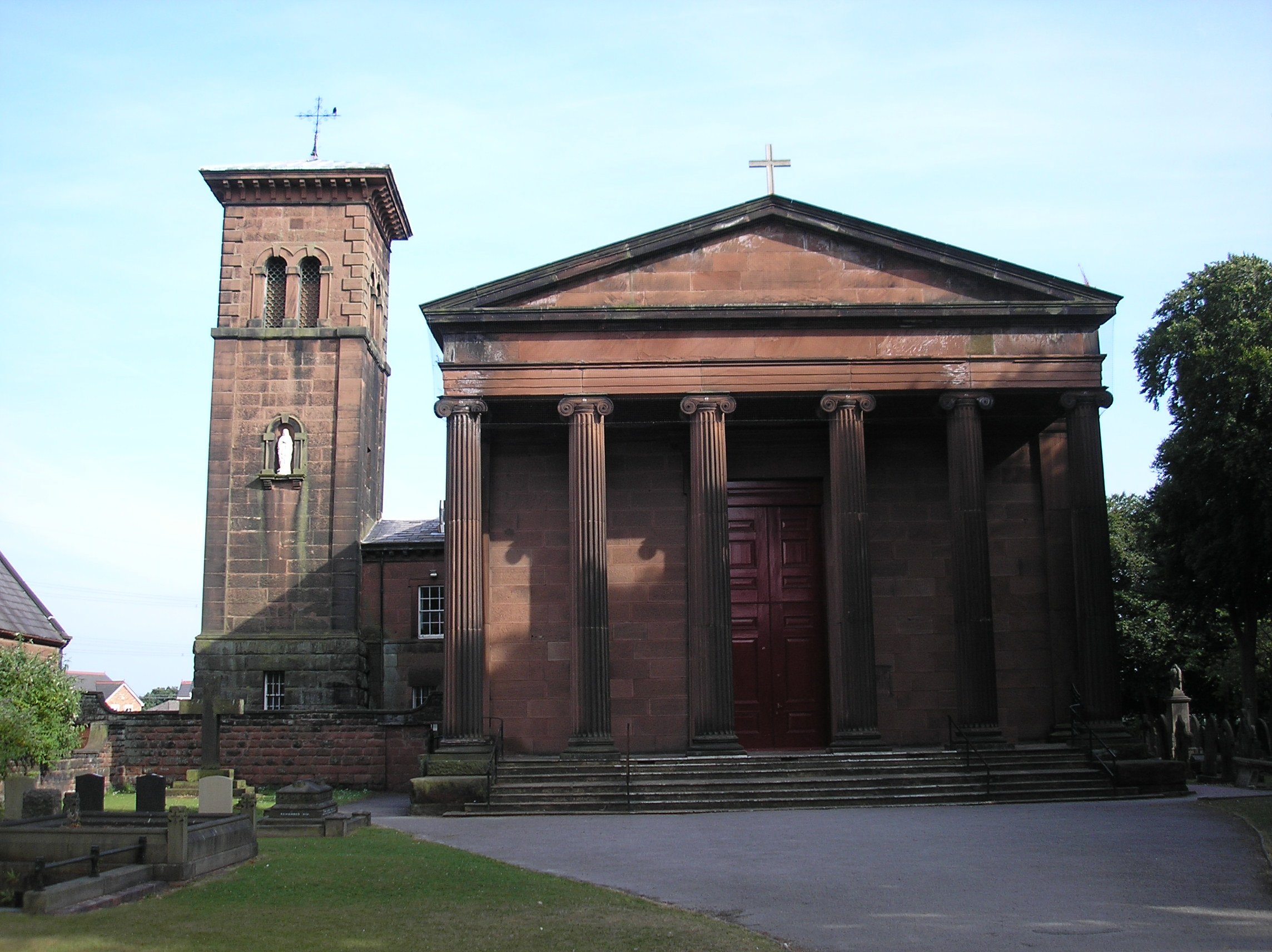
- St Bartholomew's Church, Rainhill

- Location within Merseyside
- Interactive map showing the parish boundary
- Population: 11,019 (2021 census)
- OS grid reference: SJ494912
  - London: 173 mi (278 km) SE
- Civil parish: Rainhill
- Metropolitan borough: St Helens
- Metropolitan county: Merseyside
- Region: North West
- Country: England
- Sovereign state: United Kingdom
- Post town: Prescot
- Postcode district: L35
- Dialling code: 0151
- Police: Merseyside
- Fire: Merseyside
- Ambulance: North West
- UK Parliament: St Helens South and Whiston
- Website: rainhillparishcouncil.gov.uk

Rainhill is a village and civil parish in the Metropolitan Borough of St Helens, Merseyside, England. The population at the 2011 census was 10,853.

Historically part of Lancashire, Rainhill was a township in the ecclesiastical parish of Prescot and hundred of West Derby. Following the Local Government Act 1894, it became part of the Whiston Rural District.

The Rainhill Trials of 1829 resulted in the selection of Stephenson's Rocket as the world's first modern steam locomotive.

== History ==
=== Early history ===
Rainhill has been recorded since Norman times but its name is believed to come from the Old English personal name of Regna or Regan. It is thought that around the time of the Domesday Book Rainhill was a part of one of the townships within the "Widnes fee". Recordings have shown that in the year 1246, Roger of Rainhill died and the township was divided into two halves for each of his daughters. One half was centred on the now-standing Rainhill Manor public house, see Rainhill Stoops below, and the other centred on Rainhill Hall, just off Blundell's Lane.

=== Industrial Revolution ===
Towards the end of the 18th century, four Catholic sons of a farmer, who came from the area around Stonyhurst, decided to seek their fortunes in Liverpool. The names of the brothers were Joseph, Francis, Peter and Bartholomew Bretherton. In 1800, Bartholomew decided to break into the coaching business. The partnership that he had with one or two of his brothers quickly built up and by 1820, he had the bulk of the coaching trade of Liverpool. He was running coaches to and from Manchester fourteen times a day from the Saracen's Head in Dale Street, Liverpool. Bartholomew chose Rainhill as his first stage and he developed facilities on the land alongside the Ship Inn (originally the New Inn by Henry Parr 1780) and on this site, he was believed to be stabling at least 240 horses, coach horses, and farriers, coachbuilders and veterinaries.

Bartholomew had begun to purchase land in Rainhill, and in 1824, he bought the manor of Rainhill from Dr James Gerrard of Liverpool. By 1830, he owned over 260 acres (1.1 km^{2}) around Rainhill. In 1824, across the road from the stables, he built Rainhill House and laid out beautiful gardens around it. Between 1923 and 2014 the house was known as Rainhill Hall, serving as a retreat centre run by the Society of Jesus. Since 2017 it has reverted to Rainhill Hall and is a wedding venue.

During the Victorian era, Rainhill was the location of a notorious mass murderer; Frederick Bailey Deeming. In March 1892, the bodies of a woman and her four children were discovered buried under the concrete floor of Dinham Villa, Lawton Road, Rainhill.

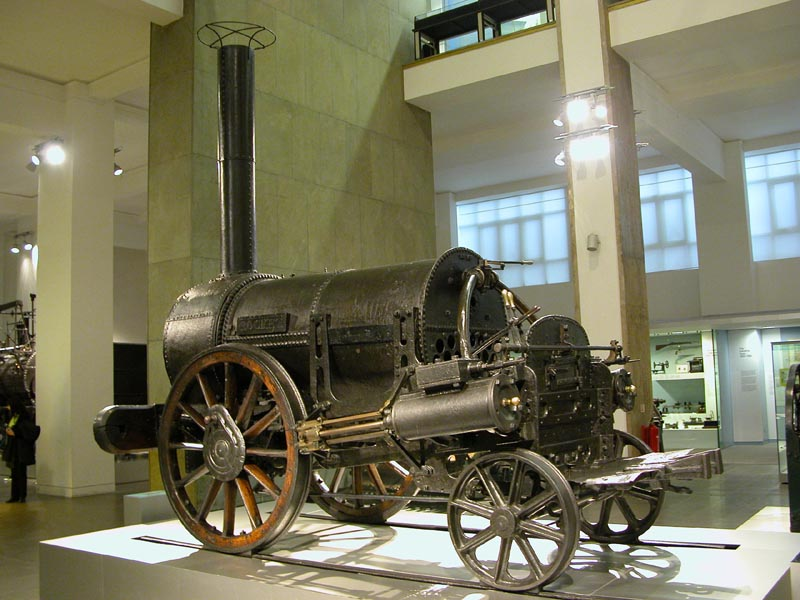
The preserved Rocket

Rainhill was the site of the 1829 Rainhill trials, in which several railway locomotives were entered in a competition to decide a suitable design for use on the new Liverpool and Manchester Railway. The winner was the Rocket designed by George Stephenson. In 1979, the 150th anniversary of the trials was celebrated by a cavalcade of trains through the ages, including replicas of the winner and runner-up in the trials.

== Geography ==
The village of Rainhill lies 1.5 miles (2.4 km) east of Prescot, 2.9 miles (4.7 km) south-southwest of St Helens, 3.7 miles (6.0 km) east-northeast of Huyton and 9.3 miles (15 km) east of Liverpool City Centre.

=== Rainhill Stoops ===
The most southerly area of Rainhill is known as Rainhill Stoops.

The name of junction 7 of the M62 motorway and the A570 is known as "Rainhill Stoops".

Warrington Road was a prominent road as a route between the larger settlements of Liverpool, Prescot and Warrington with Rainhill on the route. The stoops (a historic marker, waypost or similar guide) existed along the road at key positions.

With the establishment in 1753 of the Liverpool to Prescot turnpike, and its subsequent extension to Rainhill and then on to Warrington, a system of toll bars was installed, with one such barrier at the stoops.

== Demographics ==
Census population of Rainhill parish
Census	Population	Female	Male	Households	Source
2001	11,913	6,153	5,760	4,764	
2011	10,853	5,548	5,305	4,551	
2021	11,019	5,655	5,364	4,788	

== Landmarks ==
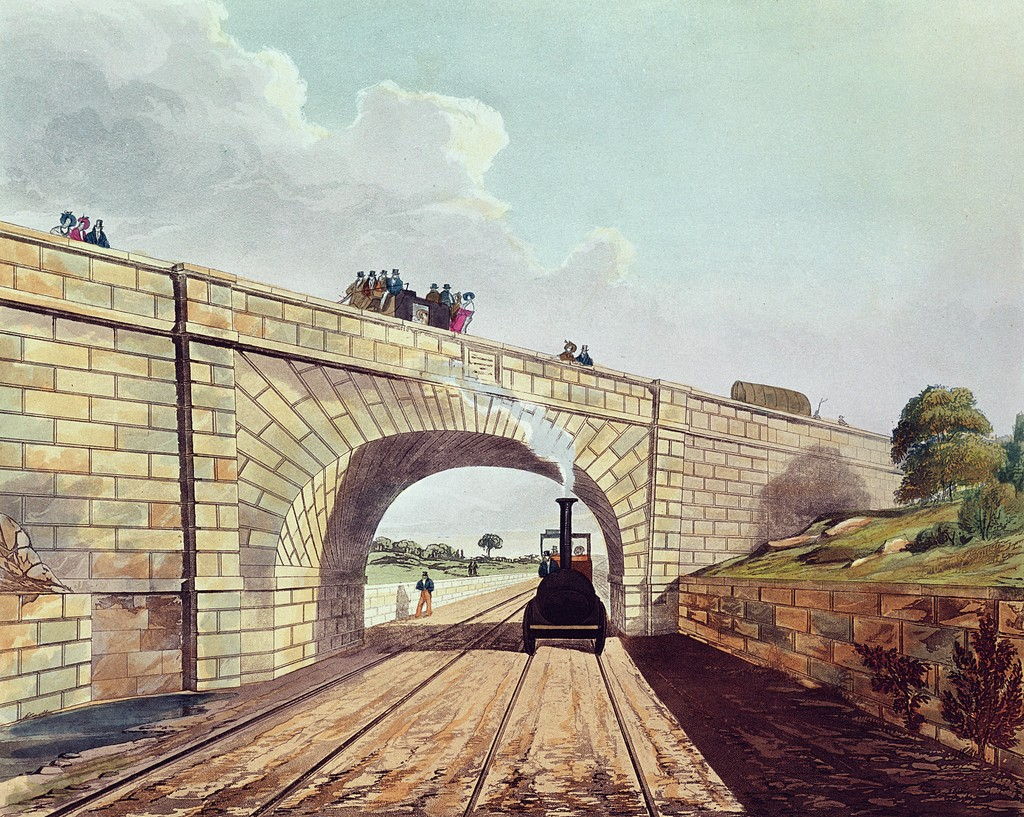
Skew bridge. Coloured engraving from 1831

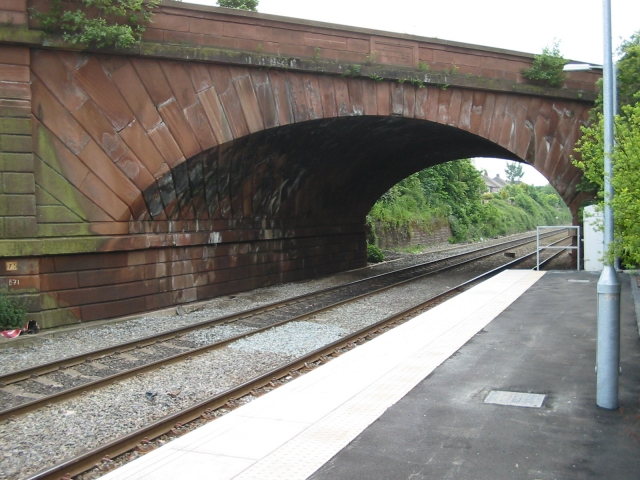
Skew bridge as seen today.

Rainhill has several churches including St Ann's, St Bartholomew's and St James' – which are Church of England, Roman Catholic and Methodist, respectively. There is also an evangelical church. St Ann's well, a medieval stone-lined structure is on the border with Sutton.

A feature of the village is the George Stephenson Skew bridge, a skew arch bridge of sandstone construction that carries the main road over the railway. It takes its name from the unusual diagonal angle at which the railway passes under the bridge. It is the world's first bridge to cross over a railway at an angle. The bridge was later widened to accommodate increases in road traffic. The milestone on the bridge that informs travellers of the distances to Warrington, Prescot and Liverpool was moved to the opposite side at the time of the expansion. Therefore, the distance markers pointed to the wrong destinations. This quirk was corrected in 2005 when the milestone was returned to the correct side of the bridge.

== Economy ==
Rainhill is now primarily a commuter village, mainly for workers in Liverpool but also St Helens and Widnes. Housing on the southerly side of Rainhill is a mixture of semi-detached and detached dwellings, whereas homes to the north, across the Skew Bridge there is a more varied mixture of housing with examples of terraced with semi-detached as well as bungalows. Rainhill as a whole has a mixture of modern, inter-war and Victorian dwellings.

Rainhill has several medical centres but the largest and most notable is Scott Clinic which once treated Michael Abram after he was convicted of stabbing Beatles member George Harrison. Rainhill was also home to Rainhill Hospital at one time the largest mental health asylum in the world; which, in December 1911, housed 1,990 patients. This was demolished in 1991. Its former site is now a housing estate as well as accommodating Reeve Court, an extra-care housing project for older people.

== Transport ==
Rainhill railway station is situated on the Liverpool City Line, between the railway stations of Whiston and Lea Green.

Rainhill railway station is situated on the historic Liverpool and Manchester Railway line, served by regular regional services on the Liverpool City Line. The station is positioned between Whiston railway station to the west and Lea Green railway station to the east. It provides direct passenger connections to Liverpool Lime Street, Manchester Victoria, and Wigan North Western. The station sits adjacent to the grade II-listed skew bridge, an architectural landmark constructed in 1829 to carry the Warrington Egerton turnpike road over the pioneering railway at an acute angle.

Local bus services connect Rainhill with nearby urban centres across Merseyside and Cheshire. Public bus transport is integrated into the franchised public network overseen by the Liverpool City Region Combined Authority. There are services between the village and Liverpool city centre via Kensington, Page Moss, and Huyton through Rainhill, continuing onwards to St Helens town centre and terminating at Clock Face; and south Liverpool and Halton, running from the Liverpool One bus station via Wavertree and Rainhill to Widnes town centre.

== Education ==
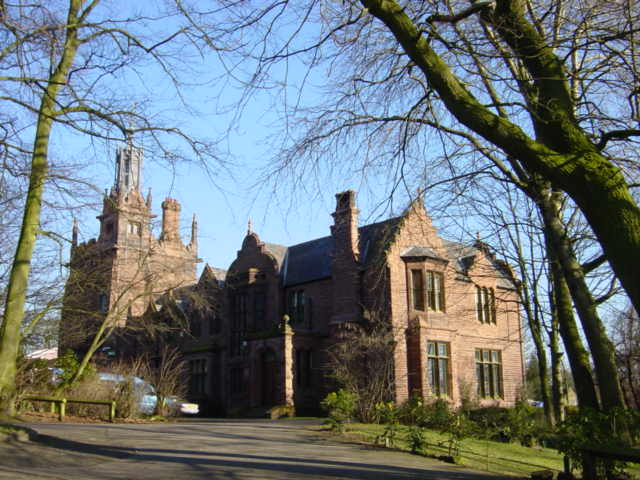
Tower College

There are several primary schools in Rainhill: Oakdene, Longton Lane, St Ann's and St Bartholomew's. Secondary education is provided by Rainhill High School which caters for students aged 11–18. Rainhill High School has a Sixth Form Centre offering A-levels and Level 3 vocational qualifications. Part of the Stephenson Trust, Rainhill High School and Sixth Form Centre is the lead academy in the trust. Tower College is also situated in Rainhill and is a private independent school which provides education for children aged 3–16.

== Sports ==
Rainhill is home to several sporting clubs including Rainhill Town AFC, Rainhill Cricket Club, Rainhill Rockets, Rainhill United JFC and Blundell's Hill Golf Club as well as Sanshou uk Merseyside based at forge fitness rainhill. Mohammed Ashraful, the Bangladesh national cricket team captain made several appearances for Rainhill Cricket Club in 2006.

== People and culture ==
Rainhill is a suburban area with households mainly of families and the elderly.

Crime in Rainhill had a 3.6% decrease in total recorded crime from 2010 to 2011 however there was a 33% rise in vehicle theft, a 9% increase in drug offences and a 3% growth in criminal damage and arson.

Former Beatles guitarist and famous Liverpudlian George Harrison makes a jokey reference to Rainhill in a lyric in the title song from his 1982 LP Gone Troppo.

"Quite like, you ain't seen a sunset. Could be, living in Rainhill" - Gone Troppo (1982).

The reference contrasts Harrison’s good fortune at spending part of his time living in tropical parts of the globe like Hawaii and the Solomon Islands with his Merseyside roots.

== Notable people ==
- Melanie C (also known as Sporty Spice) from the Spice Girls was brought up in Rainhill before moving to Widnes.
- Frank Cottrell-Boyce, screenwriter and novelist, was brought up in Rainhill.
- David Yates, film and television director, was brought up in Rainhill.
- Ian Nolan, former Tranmere Rovers F.C. footballer, lives in Rainhill.
- Les Dennis, a television presenter, lived in Rainhill.
- Steve Coppell, ex-Manchester United F.C. winger and ex-Reading F.C. manager, was brought up and lived in Rainhill.
- Sue Smith, an international women's footballer, was a pupil at Rainhill High School and lives in Rainhill.
- Jenny Welsby, an England women's international rugby league player, was brought up and lived in Rainhill.
- Alan A'Court is an English footballer who mostly played for Liverpool.
- Cliff Hall of The Spinners lived in Rainhill.
- Raheem Sterling, footballer for Chelsea F.C. and England, attended Rainhill High School.
- Andre Wisdom, footballer from Derby County F.C., lives in Rainhill.
- Jordon Ibe, a footballer for AFC Bournemouth, attended Rainhill High School.
- Willy Russell, playwright, was born in Whiston Hospital and lived in Rainhill as a child.
- Trent Alexander-Arnold, footballer for Liverpool and England, attended Rainhill High School.
- Ben Woodburn, a Welsh footballer attended Rainhill High School.
