= 1842 Grand National =

English steeplechase horse race

- Grand National
- Location: Aintree
- Date: 2 March 1842
- Winning horse: Gaylad
- Starting price: 7/1
- Jockey: (England) Tom Olliver
- Trainer: (England) George Dockeray
- Owner: John Elmore
- Conditions: Good to soft

The 1842 Grand Liverpool Steeplechase was the fourth official annual running of a steeplechase, later to become known as the Grand National Steeplechase, a horse race which took place at Aintree Racecourse near Liverpool on 2 March 1842 and attracted 15 runners.

Although recorded by the press at the time as the seventh running of the Grand Liverpool, which was renamed the Grand National in 1847, the first three runnings were poorly organised affairs and are today regarded as unofficial.

The race was not run as a handicap chase and therefore all the runners were declared to carry 12 stone with the exception of the winner of the 1840 Cheltenham Steeplechase who had to carry 13 stone 4 lbs.

== Competitors and Betting ==
- 5/1 Favourite was Lottery who again was burdened with the Cheltenham penalty of 13 stone 4 lbs. The 1839 winner was partnered for the fourth time in the race by Jem Mason, one of five riders having a fourth ride in the race.
- 6/1 Peter Simple, an eight-year-old grey entire who had been third last year. He was a debut ride for Robert Hunter, one of eight rookies in the race.
- 6/1 Seventy Four, the nine-year-old runner up of 1839, providing a fourth ride for last year's winning jockey A Powell.
- 7/1 Gaylad, an 8-year-old fourth ride for Tom Olliver who had finished second in 1839.
- 8/1 Sam Weller, an 8-year-old owned by Lottery's rider Jem Mason and providing P Barker with his fourth National ride.
- 10/1 Consul, a 10-year-old ridden by F Oldaker
- 10/1 Lucks All, a 10-year-old ridden by Thomas Goddard
- 100/7 Satirist, a 6-year-old, which, when unofficial Nationals are included, was giving 1840 winner, Bartholomew Bretherton his fourth ride.
- 15/1 The Returned, an 8-year-old ridden by William Hope-Johnstone
- 20/1 Banathlath, a 7-year-old ridden by Peter Colgan
- 20/1 Bangalore, a 10-year-old ridden by Captain William Peel

The remaining runners did not command a starting price from the bookmakers and were sent off unquoted.

- Anonymous, a 10-year-old ridden by his owner, G Moore
- Columbine, an 8-year-old who had fallen in 1840 and was ridden this year by Larry Byrne.
- Honesty, an 8-year-old ridden by William McDonough
- Lady Langford ridden by J Abbott

== The race ==
The course consisted of two circuits of a spindle-shaped course at Aintree, starting from a position beyond the modern Melling Road, then known as the Sunken Lane, and into open countryside. The competitors would have to negotiate any hedges and banks they came across to travel from field to field, most of which were open ploughland, until reaching Becher's Brook, a man-made post and rail.

From here the field then turned left towards the Leeds to Liverpool canal, before jumping the Canal Turn, a fence at a sharp 90-degree angle. This would then place the runners in the fields running along the canal, where they would jump Valentine's Brook, The Tabletop, a fence in which the landing side was significantly raised, and then across the lane at Anchor Bridge to re-enter the racecourse.

From here, the land was laid to turf as the runners turned left and came back towards the stands. Here they had to negotiate the monument or make a fence, today known as the chair, and then a water jump before setting off on a second circuit of the course. The start of the second circuit was marked by the Sunken Lane, a bank into and then out of what is now Melling Road. The rest of the second circuit was the same as the first until turning back onto the racecourse. On reaching the race course for a second time, the runners would this time jump two hurdles before a long run into the finish line, bypassing the monument fence and water jump on the way.

Anonymous and Columbine led the competitors around the first circuit, in which Consul was the first to exit the race after being knocked over by The Returned despite his rider, Oldacre, having clearly been heard to shout "Line" to the other riders as he approached Becher's Brook. Signifying that he had chosen a particular line of course that the other riders should respect. Sam Weller fell at the fence after Becher's but his rider opted not to remount, instead aiming to run the horse in a later hurdle.

At the start of the second circuit, Honesty refused at the bank out of the Sunken Lane, where Satirist also fell. Peter Simple took up the running, and by the time Becher's Brook was reached for the second time, the competitors were spread out over a furlong of the course.

Peter Simple still led at the Canal Turn, but it was here that Lottery was pulled up after showing signs of distress. Only Seventy Four, Gaylad, Columbine, and The Returned were still within one field {fence} of the leader at this point but the grey was still full of running and looked very likely to win.

At the turn for home a group of spectators, keen to get a good view, had encroached onto the course without realising. Peter Simple was by now many lengths clear but his rider failed to notice the spectators in time and in trying to avoid them he was thrown from his mount. Powell, on second-placed Seventy Four was able to take evasive action and continued towards the hurdles in the lead with only Gaylad close enough to challenge.

Seventy Four jumped the final hurdle in the lead but was very tired by this stage and failed to respond to the vigorous urgings of his rider for an extra effort. Gaylad by contrast was treated with much more compassion by his rider and responded to this nursing by finding the extra effort necessary to get up and win by four lengths. The very unfortunate Peter Simple was remounted to finish fifteen lengths back in third with The Returned fourth, a distance ahead of Banathlath. Lucks All, Lady Langford, and Lottery all walked in, albeit too far behind to be recorded as finishers by the judge. Anonymous and Columbine walked down the Sunken Lane after giving up the chase at Anchor Bridge and so did not complete the course.

The race was timed at 13 minutes and 30 seconds, a full minute outside the record.

== Finishing order ==
position	name	rider	age	weight	starting price	colours	distance or fate
Winner	Gaylad	Tom Olliver	8	12-00	7/1	Crimson	
Second	Seventy Four	Horatio Powell	9	12-00	6/1	Yellow, Brown seams	
Third {remounted}	Peter Simple	Robert Hunter	8	12-00	8/1	Plaid, Scarlet sleeves	Rider unseated at the home turn when spectators encroached onto the course
Fourth	The Returned	Captain William Hope-Johnstone	8	12-00	15/1	White	A Distance
Fifth	Banathlath	Peter Colgan	7	12-00	20/1	White	
Sixth*	Lucks All	Thomas Goddard	10	12-00	10/1	Crimson, Purple sleeves	*Completed the course but may not have taken all the jumps
Seventh*	Lady Langford	J Abbott		12-00	Not quoted	White	*Completed the course but may not have taken all the jumps
Eighth*	Lottery	Jem Mason		13-04	5/1 favourite	Crimson	*Completed the course but most likely pulled up on the Canal Side and walked in.
Last to pass the post*	Bangalore	Captain William Peel	10	12-00	20/1	Blue, Orange sleeves and cap	*Completed the course but may not have taken all the jumps
Non finishers
2nd Circuit Anchor Bridge	Columbine	Larry Byrne	8	12-00	Not quoted	Blue	Pulled up, Walked in along the Lane {Modern Melling Road}
2nd Circuit Anchor Bridge	Anonymous	G Moore	10	12-00	Not quoted	Blue birds eye	Pulled up, Walked in along the Lane {Modern Melling Road}
Sunken Lane, second element	Honesty	William McDonough	8	12-00	Not quoted	White body, Black sleeves and cap	Refused {The Sunken Lane was a hedge into and out of what is now Melling Road}
Sunken Lane, second element	Satirist	Bartholomew Bretherton	6	12-00	100/7	Brown, Purple sleeves	Fell
Fencer after 1st Becher's	Sam Weller	P Barker	8	12-00	8/1	Green	Fell
Becher's 1st Circuit	Consul	F Oldacre	10	12-00	10/1	Blue, Yellow sleeves and cap	Collided with The Returned and Brought Down

Colours as published in The Liverpool Mail, Thursday 3 March 1842. Distanced refers to horses that was not in the sight of the judge when the first horse reached the chair.

== 1-2-3-4 ==
Winner: Gaylad was ridden by Tom Olliver, who was one of the most experienced riders in the race, having his fourth ride after finishing second in 1839 while riding Seventy Four. The horse was owned by Piccadilly horse trader John Elmore, already a winner with Lottery in 1839. It was also suggested that Elmore had owned a part share in 1840 Grand National winner, Jerry. He was trained by George Dockeray whose Epsom stables had also prepared Lottery and Jerry when they had won.

Second: Seventy Four, who was finishing second for the second time and carried the colours of Lord Mostyn. Jockey, Horatio Powell took a record equalling fifth ride in the race, when the three unofficial precursors were taken into consideration.

Third: Peter Simple, who was third for the second consecutive year and was carrying the colours of his rider, Robert Hunter.

Fourth: The Returned, who was also in the colours of his rider Captain William James Hope-Johnstone
