= 1844 Grand National =

English steeplechase horse race

- Grand National
- Location: Aintree
- Date: 28 February 1844
- Winning horse: Discount
- Starting price: 5/1 JF
- Jockey: Mr John Crickmere
- Owner: Mr Quartermaine
- Conditions: Heavy (rain)

The 1844 Grand Liverpool Steeplechase was the ninth annual running of a handicap steeplechase, later to be regarded as the sixth official running of the Grand National Steeplechase, a horse race which took place at Aintree Racecourse near Liverpool on Wednesday 28 February 1844 and attracted a field of 16 runners from a field of 41 entrants. It was won by the 5/1 co favourite, Discount, ridden by John Crickmere.

== The Course ==
The only change to the course recorded by the reporter of the Liverpool saturn was that fence thirteen, the stone wall, in front of the stands, was removed and replaced with an artificial hurdle. Another hurdle was added on the course between the training ground and the distance chair. The other fifteen fences were described as being unchanged from the description provided by the same newspaper the previous year.

Start – Just beyond the Melling Road. Fence 1 [17] on the second circuit] Plain good fence. Fence 2 [18] Plain good fence. Fence 3 [19] Plain good fence. Fence 4 [20] Plain good fence. Fence 5 [21] The Upper Brook, where Captain Beecher fell in 1839. Fence 6 [22] A fence inclined to the left that takes the runners towards the Canal side. Fence 7 [23] A fence inclined to the left that takes the runners towards the Canal side. Fence 8 [24] A fence inclined to the left that takes the runners towards the Canal side. Fence 9 [25] A large water jump. Fence 10 [26] Out of the second field along the Canal. Fence 11 [27] Out of the third field along the Canal. Fence 12 [28] A fence into the Anchor Bridge Road. Fence 13 An artificial hurdle leaving the training ground on the racecourse proper [this was a newly added obstacle] Fence 14 An artificial hurdle at the distance chair in front of the stands [replaced the stone wall]. Fence 15 An artificial brook thirteen feet span with a rail. Fence 16 A bank into the Melling Road. Fence 29 An artificial hurdle adjacent to the distance chair on the run in.

On jumping fence twelve the runners would continue onto the widest part of the course, known as the training ground, making the straight along the stands as long as possible a run before starting the second circuit. After jumping fence twenty-eight the runners would turn towards the racecourse at an earlier point, this time jumping the hurdle on the other side of the distance judge's chair.

== Finishing order ==
| Position | Name | Rider | Age | Weight | Starting Price | Distance or Fate | Colours |
| Winner | Discount | John Crickmere | 6 | 10-12 | 5/1 co favourite | 20 lengths | Pink with blue sleeves |
| Second | The Returned | Bill Scott | | 12-00 | 15/1 | 1 length | Crimson |
| Third | Tom Tug | Harry Rackley | | 10-07 | Not quoted | Refused Fence one, went on. A distance clear of 4th | White with yellow buttons |
| Fourth | Caeser | P Barker | | 11-10 | Not quoted | | Cream with purple sleeves |
| Fifth | Lather | Thomas Ball | | 11-02 | Not quoted | Broke Down | Cream with blue sleeves |
| Sixth | The Romp | Larry Byrne | | 10-07 | 25/1 | | Blue |
| Seventh | Marengo | Bartholomew Bretherton | | 10-10 | 5/1 co favourite | | White with yellow sleeves |
| Eighth | Little Peter | H B Hollinshead | | 10-12 | Not quoted | | Yellow with blue sleeves |
| Ninth | Louis Philippe | J Powell | | 11-00 | 20/1 | | Pink and white stripes |
Non finishers
| Fence twenty-nine | Peter Simple | John Frisby | | 12-12 | Not quoted | Fell Fence six, remounted and later Pulled up | Crimson |
| Fence twenty-nine | Wiverton | Tom Olliver | | 12-04 | 8/1 | Pulled Up | Pink with green sleeves |
| Fence twenty-nine | Heslington | William McDonough | | 12-00 | 8/1 | Refused third fence and fell at fence nineteen, remounted and pulled up | Yellow |
| Fence twenty-nine | Nimrod | Allen McDonough | | 10-10 | 14/1 | Fell on the first circuit, remounted and later pulled up | Purple and white stripes |
| Fence twenty-nine | Charity | Horatio Powell | | 10-07 | 13/1 | Fell Fence Fifteen, remounted and later pulled up | Purple with yellow sleeves |
| Fence twenty-nine | Teetotum | V. Sharkey | | | Not quoted | Pulled up | Light blue |
| Fence five | Robinson | J. Parker | | 12-07 | Not quoted | Refused fence four and five. | Navy and pink stripes |

== Details ==
The only detailed record of the day and the race was taken by the journalist of the Liverpool Mercury, which was syndicated and published by most other papers that reported the events of the race. Heavy rain had fallen regularly in the days leading up to the race, resulting in a smaller attendance than had recently been seen. A further heavy shower, which started shortly before the race, continued throughout the event.

Of the sixteen riders who weighed out for the race, five were making their debut, all on largely unconsidered outsiders. Tom Olliver was the only rider taking part who had competed in all six Grand Liverpool's to date while Allen McDonough and Horatio Powell were also taking part in the feature race of the Spring meeting for the sixth time, having featured in the pre 1839 unofficial Grand Liverpool's.

The runners set off at a moderate pace, led by The Returned towards the first fence where Tom Tug and Robinson both refused. The former very quickly took the fence at the second attempt but Parker was unable to induce his mount and after several attempts, gave up and returned to the stables. On the very heavy going the pace was so slow on the plough that Tom Tug was soon able to make up the ground and led the field over the great water jump by the Canal. Peter Simple was among the leading half dozen when he fell at the Anchor Bridge but was remounted very quickly before many of the horses struggling at the rear has reached the fence.

Tom Tug retained a good lead on jumping the artificial brook and was followed by The Returned, Discount, Peter Simple, The Romp and Charity who fell. Powell was able to quickly remount and continue with only the tailed off Little Peter behind him.

Rackley upped the tempo on Tom Tug and increased his lead throughout the second circuit, coming back over the Anchor Bridge many lengths ahead of Marengo, Discount and The Returned, who themselves were clear of the remainder, most of whom now appeared to be quite distressed. Tom Tug too appeared to be rapidly tiring and his lead was quickly cut down by the chasing trio of whom Marengo appeared to be travelling the strongest. It was Discount however who found the extra pace to kick on, passing Tom Tug well before reaching the distance chair and going on to win easily by twenty lengths. The Returned pipped a very distressed Tom Tug for second place while Marengo pulled up to a walk on the run in and was passed by Caesar, The Romp and Lather. Little Peter and Louis Philippe may also have completed the course though a great number of the runners gave up the chase after Anchor Bridge and walked in, bypassing the final hurdle. The timekeeper lodged the official time as 13 minutes 58 seconds, which was 1 minute and 28 seconds slower than the record for the race.

The very heavy going left many quite distressed at the finish, with Lather found to have broken down badly, though it wasn't recorded if the horse was spared by the vet. Reporters were also doubly challenged to record the race as many riders weighed out in crimson colours, a popular trend at the time, despite only one entry being officially listed as carrying crimson. As the race progressed it became increasingly difficult to distinguish the colours of the riders in any case as they were so heavily covered in mud. Harry Rackley, the rider of Tom Tug had to be helped from his saddle and was on the point of fainting as it emerged he'd taken part while still weakened from injuries received in a fall the previous week. Despite this, four of the competitors raced again in the next two races on the same card. Wiverton won a match race after the National while Heslington, Robinson and Peter Simple took part in the Champion Hurdle

The winning rider, John Crickmere was riding in his second National having finished third the previous year. he was twenty-two years old and would go on to have one further ride in the race before dying of consumption in 1846. The previous year he had been very unlucky to lose the race and commented on this to the winning rider, Tom Olliver who had responded by saying that he had stopped for a smoke to allow Crickmere's mount to catch up. This year Olliver failed to complete the course, prompting Crickmere to ask him where Olliver had stopped for a smoke this year to which Olliver replied with a smile that this year he had instead stopped for a drink in Kirby. On the official Aintree records published each year in the race card he is listed as either Mr Crickmere or H Crickmere. The owner was a Piccadilly horse dealer by the name of Mr Quartermaine. The winning horse was by Sir Hercules out of Minikin and was originally named Magnum Bonum.
