= 1851 Grand National =

English steeplechase horse race

- Grand National
- Location: Aintree
- Date: 26 February 1851
- Winning horse: (Ireland) Abd-El-Kader
- Starting price: 7/1
- Jockey: T. Abbott
- Trainer: Joseph Osborne
- Owner: Joseph Osborne
- Conditions: Good

The 1851 Grand National was, at the time, the 14th renewal of a handicap steeplechase horse race that took place at Aintree near Liverpool, England, on 26 February 1851. However, this was later retrospectively recorded as the 13th official running by the Steeplechase Calendar of 1864 when the race of 1838 was disregarded as official.

The race was won by Abd-El-Kader, becoming the first dual winner and the first to do so in consecutive years (discounting The Duke, 1836/1837 whose wins are not included in official race records). Known affectionately as "Little Ab", the horse stood at just under fifteen hands.

== Course Changes ==
The start area from previous years was sowed with wheat so the grass field to the left of this was used instead, although the runners did pass over the wheat field at the start of the second circuit. The span of the water jump in front of the stands was also increased to 15 feet

The third fence, which had previously been a post and rails, was replaced with a ditch and bank and an additional hurdle was placed between the Canal bridge and the racecourse proper.

Many of the other fences on the course had been shored up with fresh timber and made stiffer, ending the criticism of the fences which had been made through the late 1840s.

Start A field adjoining the previous starting field, laid to wheat this year, Fence 1 {17} New timber replacing Sturdy planks, Fence 2 {18} New timber on earth bank, Fence 3 {19} New rails on earth bank, Fence 4 {20} Post and rails replaced this year with an old dead hedge, Fence 5 {21} Becher's Brook, Fence 6 {22} Bank, Fence 7 {23} Bank and ditch, previously referred to as the double, Fence 8 {24} Extreme turn, previously an artificial brook, Fence 9 {25} Brook at the Canal aka Valentine's Brook for the first time, Fence 10 {26} Hedge, the adjacent gate against which Daly broke his thigh last year was moved away from the fence, Fence 11 {27} Post and rails, Fence 12 {28} Ditch Fence 13 {29} Hedge at Canal Bridge after which the runners re-enter the race course at the first opportunity Fence 14 Thorn Fence aka the Made fence at the back of the distance chair Fence 15 Artificial brook aka the Water jump, increased to fifteen feet Fence 16 Proceed's lane, the runners now cross the wheat field adjacent to the start and jump fences 1-13 again. On jumping Canal bridge, the runners continue past the turn into the training ground to line up for the hurdles. Fence 30 New hurdle placed between the Canal bridge and two mile marker Fence 31 Gorsed hurdle aka Long length hurdles Fence 32 Gorsed hurdle aka Distance hurdles.

This was the last year in which Proceed's Lane, fence sixteen was an obstacle on the course. Having already had the hedge into the lane removed a few years earlier, the hedge out was also removed before the 1852 Grand National, leaving just a slightly sunken lane. This was eventually levelled when Proceed's Lane became Melling Road.

== Leading contenders ==
There was an element of criticism of the event this year due to several highly fancied withdrawals in the days prior to the race, principally Rescue who was to be the mount of Tom Olliver the duel winner and only rider to have ridden in every official National.

Rat Trap was listed as an 11/2 favourite after the eve of race betting exchanges, which this year predominantly took place in Lucas' Repository at The Talbot Hotel on Great Charlotte Street. This stretched to 6/1 before the off and was based largely on the fact he was being partnered by former winning jockey, Jem Mason and was also carrying eleven lbs less than when failing to complete the course last year. The favourite's chances suffered a blow when refusing at the third fence, although Mason was able to get the horse over quickly without losing much ground. They were back in contention along the Canal side on the second circuit but faded turning for home to finish sixth.

Sir John had finished third last year when sent off as favourite and remained well supported, despite having to give weight to all his rivals. Trained by Richard I'Anson at Curraghmore, Ireland and ridden by John Ryan, Lord Waterford's colours went to the front early on the first circuit and lay at the head of the pack in third place as two runners cut out the second circuit pace. After the final hurdle Sir John was well placed to challenge but remained a couple of lengths adrift of the two in front of him to finish third.

Abd-El-Kader Last year's winner wasn't heavily backed until the day of the race when his appearance on the course attracted the attention of the spectators. Carrying just six lbs more than in victory last year. The withdrawal of Rescue saw last season's partner in victory, Chris Green jocked off the ride when Joe Osborne engaged Tom Abbot after he in turn had been jocked off Tipperary Boy by the sudden availability of Tom Olliver. This ensured "Little Ab" was sent off as co second favourite at 7/1. Abbot kept the champion handy on the first circuit, lying a close eighth at the Canal Turn, then known as the extreme turn, and moving up to third at the Water Jump. The Irish rider showed excellent judgement on the second circuit, remaining calm to allow others to gain a lead of over ten lengths before he moved Little Ab up to challenge Sir John for third place coming to Proceed's Lane. Abbot then kicked on when entering the racecourse to challenge Maria Day at the final hurdle, where both horses made jumping errors, before Little Ab did just enough to become the first official duel winner.

Vain Hope not to be confused with another competitor called Hope, was the winner of the Wolverhampton Chase in December, beating many of his Aintree opponents. He was also one of two entries for William Vevers, which led the owner to declare which of his two competitors he was placing his faith. The betting public followed and respected Vevers' judgement and led to his declared runner being a 7/1 morning second favourite, although he drifted slightly to 8/1 by the off. Under Sam Darling Junior, Vain Hope was kept well to the rear for most of the contest, only starting to make progress after jumping Becher's for the second time. Unfortunately he never gave his backers a run for their money and was never closer than fifth on the run in.

Tipperary Boy Impressed when finishing fourth last year when completely unconsidered by the public. He also impressed again with a front running performance in finishing second in the Worcestershire Grand Annual Chase in December when ridden by Ablett. However, it was only when Rescue was a late withdrawal and Tom Olliver became available that the real money was laid on the horse, with booked rider, Tom Abbot fatefully switching to Abd El Kader. The pair were sent off at 10/1 and Olliver took his mount to the front rank right from the off, disputing the lead for much of the first circuit. Tipperary Boy led at the Water jump before Olliver set out to win the race early, increasing the pace to lead by six lengths at Becher's Brook. He maintained his gallop all the way back to the race course but as soon as he was passed at Canal bridge it was clear his race was run. Tipperary Boy faded rapidly to finish last of the ten who passed the post.

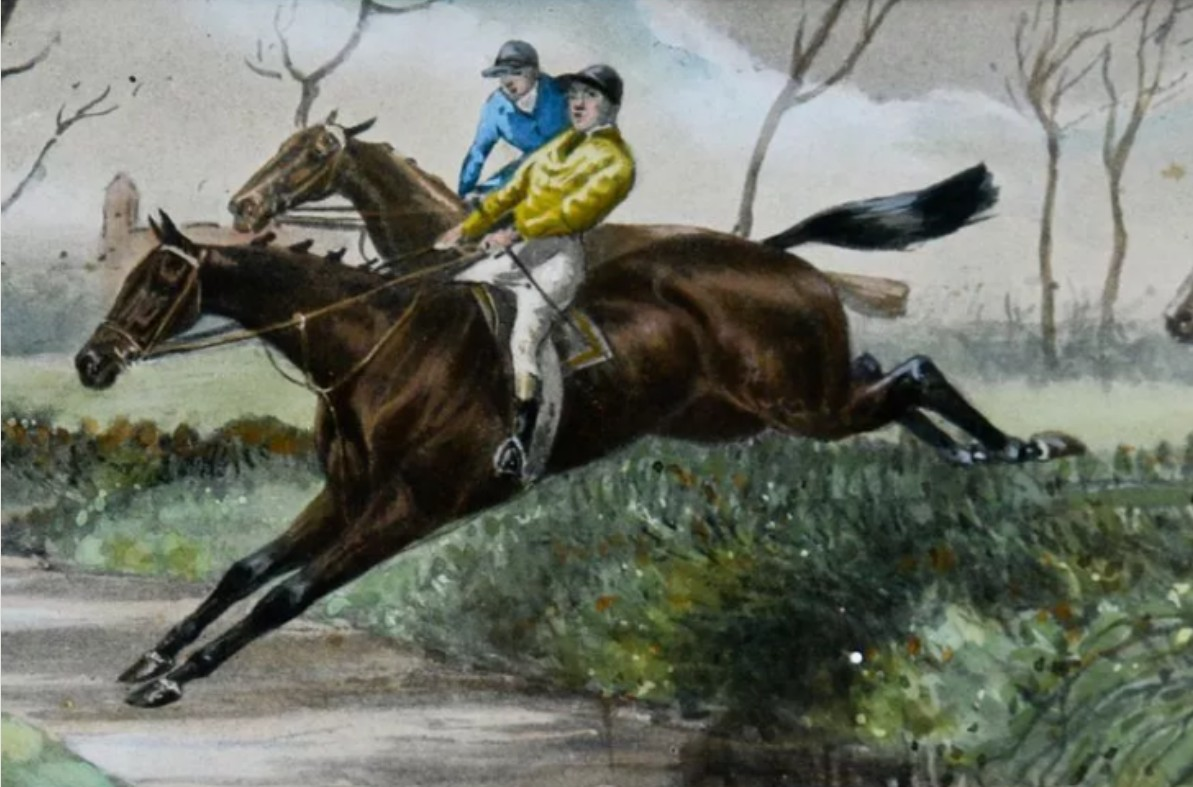
Abd El Kader {yellow} and Sir John {blue} Jump Valentine's Brook in the 1851 Grand National

== The race ==
Official records only state the first three finishers, the remainder listed merely as having also ran. However, the race was recorded in detail by most national and regional newspapers of the time, largely in agreement with the record published by Bell's Life the following Sunday.

Sir John, Hope, Half And Half, Greysteel's Mare and Peter Simple were first to show from a clean start and led the field over the early fences while favourite backers saw their chances take a blow when Rat Trap refused the third fence, although Mason rapidly righted the horse to get over at the second attempt without losing too much ground. Hope came to the front at Becher's Brook but Chris Green's stirrup leather broke between there and the extreme turn, the horse fading out of the race rapidly. Peter Simple came to the lead along the Canal Side of the course and was the subject of a large bet that he would be the first to take the Water jump, situated in front of the stands. Tubb's mount led over the fence at the distance chair but was headed by Tipperary Boy over the Water, thus losing the bet.

Sir John was third at this stage followed by Mulligan, Half And Half, Fugitive, Shinrone, Maurice Daley, The Victim, Abd El Kader and Rat Trap, who had managed to make up the ground lost in his earlier refusal. Maria Day and Currig were next while Volatile had only Vain Hope and Fugleman behind him when he fell here and although quickly remounted, wasn't persevered with.

Peter Simple and Penrith both struggled in the wheat field leaving the racecourse and dropped out of contention as Tipperary Boy upped the pace, opening up a lead of a length or two to Maria Day and Mulligan who in turn led Sir John by three lengths with Abd El Kader just behind in the main pack. The pace increased with the order remaining the same until the banks after Becher's second time where Mulligan suffered a heavy fall, being quickly remounted while Fugitive also deposited his rider in the ditch. Along the Canal side of the course Tipperary Boy maintained a two length lead over Maria Day, in turn four lengths clear of Sir John as Abd El Kader and Half and Half moved up to dispute third, while Maurice Daley, Currig, Sir Peter Laurie, Greysteel's Mare and Hope were tailed off. Vain Hope was now steadily improving from the rear and Mulligan was also gaining ground after his fall.

Coming back onto the racecourse, Tipperary Boy was tiring as Half And Half moved to the front with Sir John, Abd El Kader and Maria Day all poised to challenge and the race lay between this quartet at the penultimate hurdle. Maria Day and Abd El Kader kicked on going to the final hurdle, where both crashed through the timber, with Abd El Kader the one recovering from the mistake quickest to take a fractional advantage. Both Abbot on Abd El Kader and Frisby on Maria Day went all out on the run in as the outcome of the race remained uncertain until the final stride where Abd El Kader held on by a neck. Sir John was unable to get on terms and finished two lengths down in third with Half And Half fifteen lengths down in fourth. Vain Hope, Rat Trap, the remounted Mulligan, Shinrone, Reindeer and Tipperary Boy completed the ten finishers while The Victim fell at the final hurdle, resulting in a broken collar bone for jockey, Taylor.

== Finishing Order ==
Only the first three were officially recorded. However, there are several detailed reports of the race published in the national and regional newspapers of the time. While each report presents some minor differences, a more detailed picture of the fate of each runner can be taken from the agreement of the majority of reports.

Position	Name	Jockey	Owner	Age	Handicap (st-lb)	SP	Distance/Fate	Colours
01	Abd-El-Kader	Tom Abbott	Joseph Osborne	9	10-04	7/1	9 minutes 59 seconds	Yellow, black cap
02	Maria Day	John Frisby	Mr C Higgins	Aged	10-05	100/6	Half a neck	Yellow, purple cap
03	Sir John	Johnny Ryan	Lord Waterford	Aged	11-12	7/1	Two lengths	Light blue, black cap
04	Half-And-Half {formerly Small Beer}	Robert Sly jun	Mr Oakes	Aged	10-08	20/1	Fifteen lengths	
05	Vain Hope	Sam Darling Jnr	William Vevers	6	11-08	8/1		Purple, light blue sleeves, black cap
06	Rat Trap	Jem Mason	T F Mason	Aged	10-10	6/1 Fav	Refused fence 3, continued	Light blue, white cap
07	Mulligan	William Archer	John Elmore	7	10-02	25/1	Fell fence 22, Remounted	Scarlet, black cap
08	Shinrone	T Gaman	Mr King	7	10-07	50/1		Black, orange cap
09	Reindeer {Formerly Frank}	C. Planner	Mr May	Aged	9-08	50/1		Blue, white sleeves, black cap
10	Tipperary Boy	Tom Olliver	Mr Tollitt	7	10-03	10/1		White, black cap

== Non-finishers ==
Fence	Name	Jockey	Owner	Age	Handicap (st-lb)	SP	Fate	Colours
Fence 32 {Distance Hurdles}	The Victim	William Taylor	Mr Palmer Listed as Mr Storey in some contemporary reports	Aged	10-13	50/1	Fell	Green and white stripes, black cap
Fence 25-29	Sir Peter Laurie	Bill Scott	Mr W Barnett		11-07	25/1	Tailed off and pulled	Black, white sleeves and cap
Fence 25-29	Currig	Jack Debeau	Mr Barry	Aged	9-12	25/1	Tailed off and pulled	Green, black cap
Fence 25-29	Mare by Greysteel {Listed as Grey-Steel, Greysteel's mare and Thrift's mare in some contemporary reports}	John Thrift	Mr Onslow	Aged	9-10	50/1	Fell somewehere along the Canalside fences	Indigo, white sleeves and cap
Fence 25-29	Maurice Daley {Formerly Flycatcher}	Charles Boyce	Mr Cartwright	Aged	9-06	50/1	Tailed off and pulled up	Scarlet, black cap
Fence 25-29	Hope	Chris Green	Mr S H Kemp	Aged	10-00	50/1	Broke a stirrup leather around fence 7 and pulled up after 2nd Valentine's Brook	
Fence 23 {Bank and ditch}	Fugitive	H. Bradley	Lord Lurgan Listed as Mr Stafford in some contemporary reports	Aged	10-12	15/1	Fell	Lilac and white stripes, white cap
Fence 17-29	Penrith {Formerly Charles XII}	W. McLory	Mr Johnston	Aged	9-04	33/1	Fell between Wheat fence and Canal Bridge	Scarlet, green cap
Fence 17 {Timber}	Peter Simple	D Tubb	Tom Cunningham	13	11-07	50/1	Pulled up crossing the wheat field	White, blue sleeves and cap
Fence 17 {Timber}	Fugleman	Denny Wynne	Col Shirley	Aged	10-00	50/1	Tailed off and pulled up before fence 23	Blue and yellow hoops, black cap
Fence 15 {Water Jump}	Volatile	W Fowler	William Vevers	Aged	9-10	50/1	Fell, Remounted but immediately pulled up	Purple, light blue sleeves, black cap

== Aftermath ==
All the horses returned safely after the race while William Taylor suffered a broken collar bone when his mount, The Victim fell at the final hurdle. Meanwhile both the riders of Abd El Kader, and Maria Day were almost exhausted on returning to the unsaddling enclosure, both having left everything on the course. The closeness of the finish instantly saw the two horses made joint favourites for the Coventry Steeplechase six days later, where fifteen of their National rivals were also declared. Much to the disappointment of the public, Maria Day didn't go to post while Abd El Kader was beaten by Tom Olliver, on board The Victim, having recovered from his final fence fall in the National

While the press heaped praise on Lord Sefton and The Marquis of Waterford for staging a successful meeting, they were scathing of the two local Railway companies, stating that even the first class passengers were treated like third class. Fees were in some cases doubled while carriages departed for Aintree with passengers packed in like cattle. Many carriage doors were left unlocked and several accidents were only narrowly avoided.

Criticism of the running or Peter Simple, who led for much of the first circuit before rapidly fading crossing the wheat field to go out for the second circuit received a post script during a court case brought in 1852 by his jockey, Tubb against his employer, Edwin Parr. During the case, in which Tubb was claiming damages for lost earnings, he was compelled by the court to give an account of the instructions he received from Joseph Saxon and a Mr Barber before the National. Tubb confirmed the already publicly known £25 bet to be first over the Water Jump, misunderstood in the press as the first Brook, but that the beat was beaten when another horse passed him approaching the fence, meaning he merely received his £10 riding fee instead. However, he went on to claim that he was told "Not to win the race on any account". Tubb claimed he was not riding for Parr on this occasion but was compelled to ride to the orders of Mr Saxon and Mr Barber. Joseph Saxon published an instant rebuttal, stating that he had not given Tubb any orders at all, never mind telling him not to win, and that he could produce a gentleman whose integrity could not be doubted by all who know him, who could verify that Saxon backed Peter Simple heavily to win the National both before and during the race.
