= Angmering =

Village and parish in West Sussex, England

Coordinates: 50.82877°N 0.48458°W

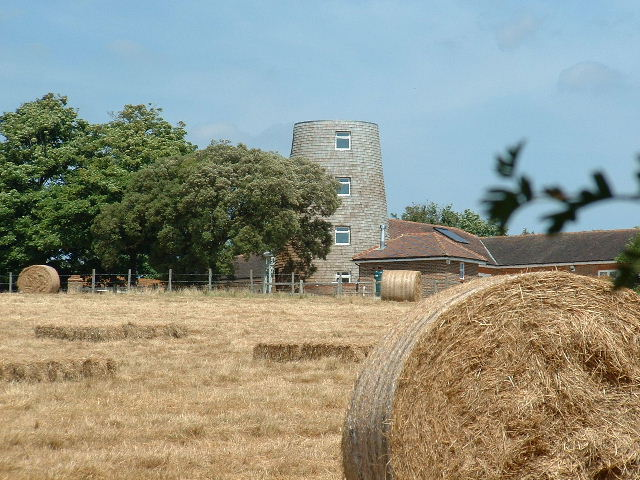
- The windmill

- Location within West Sussex
- Area: 17.82 km^{2} (6.88 sq mi)
- Population: 7,614 (Civil Parish.2011)
  - Density: 427/km^{2} (1,110/sq mi)
- OS grid reference: TQ068043
  - London: 49 miles (79 km) NNE
- Civil parish: Angmering
- District: Arun
- Shire county: West Sussex
- Region: South East
- Country: England
- Sovereign state: United Kingdom
- Post town: LITTLEHAMPTON
- Postcode district: BN16
- Dialling code: 01903
- Police: Sussex
- Fire: West Sussex
- Ambulance: South East Coast
- UK Parliament: Worthing West
- Website: Parish Council

Angmering (/ˈæŋmərɪŋ/) is a village and civil parish between Littlehampton and Worthing in West Sussex on the southern edge of the South Downs National Park, England. About two-thirds of the parish (mostly north of the A27 road) falls within the park.

It is 1.5 miles (2.4 km) north of the English Channel, and Worthing and Littlehampton are 3.5 miles (5.6 km) to the east and west respectively. It has been inhabited since the Bronze Age (visible remains of an ancient hill fort can be seen on nearby Highdown Hill) and there are the remains of a Roman Villa and bath house.

In 1976, Angmering was twinned with the Normandy town of Ouistreham on the "Riva-Bella", the location of the World War II Normandy landings' Sword Beach.

Angmering railway station is 3/4 mile from the village centre, straddling the boundaries of Angmering and East Preston.

== Etymology ==
The name Angmering probably derives from a Saxon farming settlement of about 600AD. It is thought that the original name was Angenmaering, meaning Angenmaer's people.

Various name changes took place over the centuries and these included Angemeringatun, Angmerengatum, Angemaeringum, Angemeringe, Aingmarying, Angmarrying, Angemare and Ameringe. Towards the end of the 9th century Alfred the Great, King of Wessex, bequeathed to his kinsman Osferthe ‘... Angmerengatum and the land that thereto longyth’.

== History ==
A large Roman villa was discovered nearby and part-excavated in the 1930s. The excavation was mainly centred on a large bath house complex comprising at least eight rooms. It may have been occupied by an important Roman citizen or a member of the Romano-British aristocracy, like the palace at Fishbourne, and dates from the same period of 65–75AD.

== Demography ==
With the recent development of the Bramley Green site, an influx of new residents has brought Angmering's electoral ward's resident population at the 2011 census to 7,788. In 2001 the population was 5,639, illustrating the 38.1 per cent increase in the village's population over the previous decade or so. By 2023, the population had grown to about 10,100.

=== Ethnicity ===
According to the Office for National Statistics based on the 2011 census 97.6 per cent of the 7,788 population of Angmering were white with 94.3 per cent being white British, 0.7 per cent white Irish and 2.6 per cent identifying as white Other. 2.4 percent of Angmering's residents are from a black or minority ethnic background.

=== Religion ===
According to the 2011 census, the largest religious grouping is Christians (66 per cent), followed by those of no religion (25.2 per cent). Angmering has a 12th-century Anglican church, St Margaret's (re-built by Samuel Sanders Teulon in 1852 and reordered in 2009), a small Catholic congregation centred on St Wilfred's Catholic Primary School, and a Baptist church.

== Geography ==
The parish is about seven miles (11 km) long (from north to south) and two miles (3.2 km) wide. Its roots stretch back to the Bronze Age and it is also the site of a substantial Roman villa.

The village has three schools, several small shops, a post office and many historic houses from the 15th century onwards. It is in a semi-rural area with many farms. It has had various housing developments in the area. Previously it was the most populous area of its old parliamentary constituency, however that has since changed in accordance with the boundary review in 2023 that lead to the Angmering and Findon ward being given to the Worthing West constituency. Angmering is in a unique position of being a part of the Worthing West constituency, but falling under Arun District Council; most of the constituency falls under Adur and Worthing Council.

== Sport ==
Angmering is home to Worthing Rugby Football Club, a national level professional rugby club which occupies extensive grounds in the east of the village. Angmering Football Club play their home games at the Recreation Field in Decoy Drive. They play in the West Sussex Football League. The team have had recent success in the Chichester Charity Cup, winning the cup in the 23/24 season. The team is currently managed by George Sayers.

== Notable inhabitants ==
Childhood home of Abbess Katherine Palmer (died 1576) and Thomas Palmer (d 22 August 1553) soldier and courtier executed for his support of Lady Jane Grey in the succession crisis of 1553.

The village was the birthplace of Tom Oliver, who, after adding an l to his name to become Olliver, became the winning rider of the 1842, 1843 and 1853 Grand Nationals. Impresario Lord Bernard Delfont and record producer Norman Newell have lived in Angmering. The actor and singer Stanley Holloway lived in the parish of East Preston (Angmering-on-Sea) with his wife before his death in 1982.

Portrait artist Juliet Pannett (1911–2005) and her family lived in Angmering from the mid-1960s until 2004.

== Twinning ==
Since 1976, Angmering has been twinned with the coastal French town of Ouistreham in the Calvados department of Normandy.

- Ouistreham, France

== Sources ==
- Holloway, Stanley; Richards, Dick (1967). Wiv a little bit o' luck: The life story of Stanley Holloway. London: Frewin. p. 112. OCLC 3647363.
