= 1841 Grand National =

English steeplechase horse race

- Grand National
- Location: Aintree
- Date: 3 March 1841
- Winning horse: Charity
- Starting price: 14/1
- Jockey: Horatio Powell
- Trainer: William Vevers
- Owner: (England) Lord Craven
- Conditions: Good to soft

The 1841 Grand Liverpool Steeplechase was the third official annual running of a steeplechase, later to become known as the Grand National Steeplechase handicap horse race which took place at Aintree Racecourse near Liverpool on 3 March 1841 and attracted a then smallest ever field of 11 runners.

Although recorded by the press at the time as the sixth running of the Grand Liverpool, which was renamed the Grand National in 1847, the first three runnings were poorly organised affairs.

The race was not run as a handicap chase and therefore all the runners were declared to carry 12 stone with the exception of the winner of the 1840 Cheltenham Steeplechase who had to carry 13 stone 4 lbs.

== The Course ==
The runners would set off from a grass field near Seeds lane and jump a small first fence before turning slightly right to jump a further four fences down a line of wheat fields to the first brook, described only as being familiar to Captain Beecher. The runners then proceeded left over a fallow field to take the seventh jump into a grass field to turn sharp left at the eighth obstacle, later to be known as the Canal Turn. Three further flights followed along the Canalside that took the runners over a large grass enclosure before jumping into and then out of the Melling Lane to re-enter the racecourse at its far extreme, known as the training ground. Once back in front of the stands, the runners took a hurdle at the site of the distance judge before leaping an artificial brook, which had replaced the wall, being the fifteenth obstacle. The competitors would then cover the same course again, with the exception of the artificial brook, which was bypassed on the run-in.

== Competitors & Betting ==
- 5/2 Lottery, the 1839 winner who also bore the 13 stone, 4 lb penalty weight for having won the 1840 Cheltenham chase and was ridden, as in 1839, by Jem Mason
- 4/1 Cigar, an eleven-year-old providing Allen McDonough with a record fifth ride in the race (including pre 1839 non official Nationals)
- 6/1 Peter Simple, a seven-year-old grey entire ridden by T Walker
- 12/1 Legacy, the mount of William McDonough
- 14/1 Charity, an eleven-year-old gelding who had failed to complete the course in 1839, a third ride for Horatio Powell
- 14/1 Seventy Four, the eight-year-old runner up in 1839, ridden this year by Whitworth
- 100/6 The Hawk, provided a debut ride for W Saunders
- 25/1 Goblin, a ten-year-old ridden by last year's winning jockey Bartholomew Bretherton
- 25/1 Oliver Twist, a six-year-old ridden by 1839 runner up, Tom Olliver
- 25/1 Revealer, a seven-year-old ridden by P Barker
- 25/1 Selim, a seven-year-old who bore no relation to the 1814 sire of the same name, was the mount of Captain G B Price

== The race ==
The course was as it had been the previous year with the exception that the wall, situated in front of the stands, was replaced with an artificial water jump.

Reports of the conditions and betting on the race varied widely and depended greatly on which newspaper the reader chose to get their report from after the event with Charity and Seventy-Four both listed as pre race favourite in some publications, which also varied the state of the going with everything from good to heavy. Officially Lottery is recorded as favourite on officially good going.

The race was started two hours late at 3 pm with Selim setting off at a pace considered good for a flat race. He earned a ten-length advantage by Becher's Brook and was still travelling well when he was considered unlucky to land on boggy ground when jumping out of the last fallow field into the grass at the Canalside, the eleventh jump on the course, causing him to fall and lose his lead.

Cigar was now left in front as the other runners, seeing the fate of Selim chose a different racing line to avoid the boggy ground. Legacy took up the running as they jumped in and out of the lane, at which point Goblin fell.

Legacy continued to lead a well-bunched field over the hurdle in front of the stands where the pace then rapidly quickened as the field raced for the artificial brook, spurred on by the cheering of the crowd. Cigar, Lottery, Oliver Twist and Charity jumped in close order with the remainder close behind.

On turning back out into the country for the second time Legacy took up the running again. Cigar, Peter Simple and Oliver Twist adopted a different route down to Becher's Brook to the rest of the runners and bypassed the first jump, which was allowed, as long as the competitors raced outside the course marking flags. However, no real advantage, other than missing one fence, appears to have been made and the two groups were quickly reunited to jump the remaining fences to Becher's. By this stage Selim had made up the ground lost when falling and went back into the lead at the fence before the Brook.

At the fence before the Canal Turn Oliver Twist fell and may have hampered Cigar who was the only runner continuing who was detached from the main body, but he was able to get back the lost lengths to move into second behind Charity when Selim began to fade along the Canalside. Cigar, Charity and Lottery jumped the fence out of the lane together before Charity kicked on to three-length lead on entering the racecourse. Most of the field had every chance at this stage but the injection of pace now told on most of the competitors, and with a quarter-mile to run Charity had only the two greys in the race Peter Simple and Cigar challenging him.

Peter Simple was beaten by the time the two leaders reached the final flight where Charity swerved sharply, causing Powell to have to hit him to try and get him back on a racing line. Cigar was badly hampered by this and almost fell, losing a couple of lengths in the process. From this point Charity maintained his advantage to win, with Peter Simple a further neck down in third place. Revealer, Hawk, the remounted Goblin and Legacy finished together, all claiming fourth place. The remainder were pulled up in the closing stages and were swallowed up by the crowd encroaching onto the course to hail the winner.

== Finishing order ==
Position	Name	Rider	Age	Weight	Starting Price	colours	Distance or Fate
Winner	Charity	Horatio Powell	11	12-00	14/1	Crimson	1 length
Second	Cigar	Allen McDonough	11	4/1	12-00	Green	1/2 a length
Third	Peter Simple	T Walker	7	12-00	6/1	Plaid, red sleeves	
Fourth	Revealer	P Barker	7	12-00	25/1	Crimson	Last officially recorded finisher
Distanced	Seventy Four	J Whitworth	8	12-00	14/1	Leopard skin	Pulled up and walked in
5th-7th	The Hawk	W Saunders		12-00	100/6	Yellow	Finished among four horses battling for fourth
5th-7th	Legacy	William McDonough		12-00	12/1	Scarlet plaid	Finished among four horses battling for fourth
Distanced {remounted}	Oliver Twist	Tom Olliver	6	12-00	25/1	Green	Fell at the fence between Becher's and Canal Turn second time, walked in with the crowd.
5th-7th {remounted}	Goblin	Bartholomew Bretherton	10	12-00	25/1	Green plaid	Fell at the fence out of the Melling Lane on the first circuit. Remounted and was among the tight finish for fourth place.
Distanced {remounted}	Selim	Captain G B Price	7	12-00	25/1	Blue	Fell at the last fence on the Canal Side on the 1st Circuit. Walked in with the crowd
Non finishers
	Lottery	Jem Mason		13-04	5/2 favourite	Crimson	Pulled up with half a mile to race

Note: No official returns were given for any runner outside the first three. Four competitors claimed to have finished fourth in a tight finish, in which the decision was given to Revealer. No attempt was made to place the other three officially. The remaining runners, with the exception of Lottery, completed the course but had been stopped to a walk long before the finish and were swallowed up by the spectators, who entered the racecourse after the race. At the time, horses swallowed up by the crowd in such a manner were listed as distanced.

== The placed horses ==
Winner: Charity ran in the Crimson jacket and cerise cap of Lord Craven and was prepared for the race at the stables of William Vevers in Cheltenham. His rider, A Powell had failed to finish in a place in either of his two previous Nationals. Her time of thirteen minutes and twenty-five seconds was fifty-five seconds outside the race record.

Second: Cigar ran in the colours of one Mr Anderson. Jockey Alan McDonough has also been second the previous year.

Third: Peter Simple was owned by the Hon F Craven and was a second race ride for T Walker

Fourth: Revealer ran in the Crimson colours of Henry Villebois which had been carried to victory by Jerry the previous year. Bartholomew Bretherton rode both horses.

== Sources ==
http://www.greyhoundderby.com/GN1841.htm

- www.hometown.aol.co.uk/captainbeecher/1841CHARITY.html
- Correspondent of D.E. Post contemporary report
- Irish Newsletter 4 March 1841
- Liverpool Mercury 5 March 1841. Page 5. Columns 5 & 6 [sourced at British Newspaper Archive online library]
