= 1843 in sports =

1843 in sports describes the year's events in world sport.

== Baseball ==
Events

- Semi-organised "New York Club" begins playing baseball at Elysian Fields in Hoboken, New Jersey

== Boxing ==
Events

- Ben Caunt and Tom Hyer retain the Championships of England and the United States respectively but there is no record of any fights involving either of them in 1843.

== Cricket ==
Events

- William Denison publishes the first edition of his Cricketer's Companion.

England

- Most runs – Charles Taylor 372 @ 16.90 (HS 89)
- Most wickets – William Hillyer 133 @ 8.66 (BB 7–?)

== Football ==
Events

- A set of written rules is believed to have been in existence at Eton College. These allow handling of the ball to control it but not running with it in the hand and not passing it by hand. The first known 11–a–side games take place at Eton.
- Guy's Hospital RFC is founded by staff and students of the famous medical school in London. It is today believed to be a constituent of Guy's, King's and St Thomas' RFC which therefore claims to be the world's oldest football club in any code (though see 1839 in sports). This claim is contested due to doubts about the club's continuous existence between 1843 and 1883. It is now a rugby union club, playing at Honor Oak Park in Brockley and currently (2008) operates in London League 4 South East.

== Horse racing ==
England

- Grand National – Vanguard
- 1,000 Guineas Stakes – Extempore
- 2,000 Guineas Stakes – Cotherstone
- The Derby – Cotherstone
- The Oaks – Poison
- St. Leger Stakes – Nutwith

== Rowing ==
The Boat Race

- The Oxford and Cambridge Boat Race is not held this year.

Other

- The first collegiate rowing club in the U.S. is established at Yale University.
