= 1841 in sports =

1841 in sports describes the year's events in world sport.

== Boxing ==
Events

- 2 February — Ben Caunt fights Nicholas Ward at Crookham Common for the Championship of England. As in Ward's fight with Burke a few months earlier, there is controversy as the referee is again forced by Ward's backers to rule in his favour. The referee disqualifies Caunt in the 7th round for allegedly striking Ward when he is down. Caunt insists he did no such thing and, as in the Burke fight, Ward's backers are accused of fixing the result.
- 11 May — return bout between Caunt and Ward is won fairly by Caunt who knocks out Ward in the 35th round. Caunt is now the undisputed English champion, especially as Ward announces his retirement.
- 9 September — Tom Hyer is acclaimed the first American Champion after defeating George McChester at Caldwell's Landing, New York, over 101 rounds.
- 10 September — Ben Caunt goes to America hoping to arrange a fight with Tom Hyer which would decide an inaugural World Championship. However, Hyer declines to fight Caunt.

== Cricket ==
Events

- Formal creation of Nottinghamshire County Cricket Club based on the old Nottingham Cricket Club

England

- Most runs – Fuller Pilch 413 @ 25.81 (HS 67)
- Most wickets – Alfred Mynn 94 (BB 7–?)

== Football ==
Events

- Rugby School is definitely playing a handling game by this time

== Horse racing ==
England

- Grand National – Charity
- 1,000 Guineas Stakes – Potentia
- 2,000 Guineas Stakes – Ralph
- The Derby – Coronation
- The Oaks – Ghuznee
- St. Leger Stakes – Satirist

== Rowing ==
The Boat Race

- 14 April — Cambridge wins the 5th Oxford and Cambridge Boat Race
