= 1840 in sports =

1840 in sports describes the year's events in world sport.

== Boxing ==
Events

- 22 September — James Burke meets Nicholas Ward at Lillingstone Level for the English Championship title, vacant again following the injury to William "Bendigo" Thompson. In highly controversial circumstances, Ward's backers prevail upon the referee to disqualify Burke in the 17th round for an alleged foul.
- The third contender Ben Caunt enhances his title claim by defeating Bill Brassey in a fight lasting 101 rounds. This victory sets up a bout with Ward the following year.

== Cricket ==
Events

- William Lillywhite's tally of 83 wickets is the highest known season total to date

England

- Most runs – Charles Hawkins 274 @ 14.42 (HS 58)
- Most wickets – William Lillywhite 83 (BB 8–?)

== Curling ==
- Establishment of the original Detroit Curling Club, substantially reorganised in 1885

== Horse racing ==
England

- Grand National – Jerry
- 1,000 Guineas Stakes – Crucifix
- 2,000 Guineas Stakes – Crucifix
- The Derby – Little Wonder
- The Oaks – Crucifix
- St. Leger Stakes – Launcelot

== Rowing ==
The Boat Race

- 15 April — Cambridge wins the 4th Oxford and Cambridge Boat Race
