= 1840 Grand National =

English steeplechase horse race

- Grand National
- Location: Aintree
- Date: 5 March 1840
- Winning horse: Jerry
- Starting price: 12/1
- Jockey: (England) Mr Bartholomew Bretherton
- Trainer: (England) George Dockeray
- Owner: Henry Villebois
- Conditions: Good

The 1840 Grand Liverpool Steeplechase was the second official annual running of a steeplechase, later to become known as the Grand National Steeplechase handicap horse race, which took place at Aintree Racecourse near Liverpool on Thursday 5 March 1840 and attracted a then smallest ever field of 13 runners.

Although recorded by the press at the time as the fifth running of the Grand Liverpool, which was renamed the Grand National in 1847, the first three runnings were poorly organised affairs.

The race was not run as a handicap chase and therefore all the runners were declared to carry 12 stone.

== Betting ==
- 3/1 favourite was the eleven-year-old mare The Nun, who had also been sent off as favourite the previous year, only to finish seventh after falling twice. Her rider, A Powell was taking his second ride in the race, having finished in eighth last year.
- 4/1 Lottery, the ten-year-old bay gelding and his partner Jem Mason who together had won the race the previous year on their debut.
- 6/1 Last year's runner up, the seven-year-old Seventy-four, partnered, as last year by Tom Olliver.
- 8/1 Arthur was a six-year-old giving Alan McDonough a record fourth ride in the race, including unofficial races, one of which he had won in 1838.
- 16/1 Jerry had been saddled to run the previous year but was a last minute withdrawal. This year the ten-year-old was partnered by local coach business owner Bartholomew Bretherton who had previously taken part in the unofficial 1836 race, finishing third.
- 100/5 Cruickshank was a debut ride for E Guy, one of seven riders taking part in their first National.
- 100/4 Valentine was giving a debut ride to his owner John Power who had wagered heavily on being the first to reach the wall at the halfway stage of the race.
- 30/1 The Augean, a seven-year-old ridden by Charles Christian, whose father Dick had finished second in the unofficial 1836 race.
- 30/1 Columbine, a six-year-old ridden by Mr Won
- 30/1 Hasty, ridden by Mr Rigg
- 30/1 The Sea, ridden by his owner Henry Beresford, 3rd Marquess of Waterford
- 30/1 Spolasco, ridden by W A Rose
- 30/1 Weathercock, an eight-year-old second ride in the race for last year's fourth placed jockey, P Barker

== The course ==
The course was laid out with eleven obstacles in total with the competitors starting from the bend at the end of the finishing straight beside the stables. The first obstacle was an iron rail of 3 feet 5 inches into the Melling Road. The runners then jumped out of the road over a hedge and ditch 7 feet 11 inches high. The third fence was also a ditch some ten feet wide and the fourth an even bigger ditch of 16 feet to clear. Fence five was a slightly smaller ditch before the runners cleared an obstacle of little consequence to be considered an actual fence. The fence that would gradually come to be known as Becher's Brook was next with a clearance of 20 feet. The runners then turned sharply towards the Canal over a considerable jump with a steep landing side. The eighth fence was the second brook and ran along the canal side, this was followed by a ditch and rail with a thirteen-foot span. The tenth fence was a leap into the Anchor Bridge and almost instantly straight back out again to bring the runners back towards the stands and the only fence on the course, a dry stone wall rising from 4 foot 6 inches to 4 foot 10 on the outside. The runners then set off to jump the first ten fences, along with other insignificant obstacles before bypassing the wall on the run to the finish post.

The majority of the course was plough land with turf only on the racecourse proper and it was speculated by witnesses that the majority of the fences had been lowered slightly from last year in the wake of criticism.

== The race ==
The competitors reached the newly named Becher's Brook without incident where Cruickshank stumbled on landing and was cannoned into by Weathercock with both falling. The former was remounted by his jockey, Guy, albeit with a severely bloodied nose while the latter's rider, Barker was carried unconscious to Seed's farmhouse nearby.

Valentine had established a good lead at this stage in his owner's bid to secure a bet that his mount would be first to complete a circuit of the course. Upon reaching the second brook beyond the Canal Turn, Valentine made to refuse, but his momentum was such that the horse corkscrewed, almost backwards over the obstacle. His rider remained in the saddle and despite his rivals gaining much ground, the pairing continued intact to complete the circuit in the lead and secure the bet while behind him Hasty fell and was quickly remounted.

Last year's champion Lottery reached the stone wall in front of the stands in second place but clipped the top of the obstacle, falling amid a flurry of dismantled masonry. All three horses following immediately behind were caught in the melee and were brought down, the three being Columbine, favourite The Nun and Seventy-four. Powell remounted the favourite but was forced to pull up before setting off on the second circuit when she was found to be lame while Olliver was taken to the stands with a broken collar bone and concussion.

The pileup allowed Valentine to re-establish a lead of many lengths over the rest of the field but he was caught shortly before reaching Becher's for the second time by Jerry and Arthur with the remaining competitors too far behind to be able to issue a challenge. Arthur fell heavily at the brook, leaving Jerry to canter home over the remaining fences to win as he liked. Arthur was quickly remounted and although he caught Valentine before jumping the final hurdle he was unable to make up the ground on Jerry and finished second by four lengths with Valentine the same distance behind in third. The remaining runners had not reached the distance chair situated beside the wall fence by the time the third horse had passed the post, thus these runners were officially declared as non finishers. Those who did pass the post were, in order, Cruickshank, Hasty, The Sea and Spolasco. The last horse had fallen during the second circuit and was remounted while The Augean also fell at some point during the second circuit.

Despite winning in a very comfortable manner, and slowing to a canter a long way before the finish, Jerry still finished in a time of twelve minutes and thirty seconds, shattering the course record by a minute and a half.

== Aftermath ==
Again the press were very critical of the race, especially noting the incident at the wall where many spectators had thought Tom Olliver had been killed by his fall, so bad was his state when being carried away to the stands. Furthermore, it was later discovered that Barker had been left unattended in a barn near Seed's farm where none of the connections of his mount had made any enquiry as to his state. As a result, the wall was replaced with a water jump in time for the next running.

== Historical inaccuracies ==
Later historical accounts of the Grand National are notorious for carrying factual errors. The official history of the race written in the 1980s recorded Cruickshank as a non runner and The Sea as an official finisher in fourth place.

== Finishing order ==
Position	Horse	Jockey	Age	Weight	Starting Price	Distance
01	Jerry	Bartholomew Bretherton	10	12-00	16/1	4 lengths
02	Arthur	Allen McDonough	6	12-00	8/1	4 lengths {Fell 2nd Brook, 2nd Circuit, Remounted
03	Valentine	John Power		12-00	100/4	Last to finish

== Non-finishers ==
Fence	Horse	Jockey	Age	Weight	Starting Price	Fate
?	The Sea	Henry Bresford		12-00	30/1	Passed the post but may not have jumped the entire course
?	Cruickshank	E Guy		12-00	100/5	Fell at Becher's Brook 1st circuit, Remounted and walked in distanced by the judge
?	Hasty	J. Rigg		12-00	30/1	Fell 2nd Brook 1st Circuit remounted, fell same obstacle 2nd circuit, remounted again and walked in, distanced by the judge.
?	Spolasco	W A Rose		12-00	30/1	Fell at the Table Top [Modern day Melling Road, 1st time], remounted, Fell jumping out of Melling Road, remounted and walked in, distanced by the judge.
16	The Nun	Horatio Powell		12-00	3/1 favourite	Brought Down at the wall, remounted but pulled up lame
16	Lottery	Jem Mason	10	12-00	4/1	Fell at the wall
16	Seventy-Four	Tom Olliver	7	12-00	6/1	Brought Down at the wall
16	Columbine	J. Beresford	6	12-00	30/1	Brought Down at the wall
26	The Augean	Dick Christian	7	12-00	30/1	Refused 1st fence, went on but fell before the end of the first circuit.
06	Weathercock	P Barker	8	12-00	30/1	Fell at Becher's on the first circuit

=== Sources ===
- www.hometown.aol.co.uk/captainbeecher/1840JERRY.html
- The Irish newsletter (various editions March 1840)
- The Times (various editions March 1840)
- A to Z of the Grand National (John Cottrell & Marcus Armytage – Highdown press, ISBN 978-1-905156-43-6)
