= Sir William =

Sir William may refer to:

- Sir William (horse), a British Thoroughbred racehorse
- Bill Dundee (born 1943), Scottish born-Australian professional wrestler
- "(Little) Sir William", an alternative name of the folk song "Sir Hugh"

== See also ==
- William (disambiguation)
