= Gaylad (horse) =

British racehorse

- Sex: Gelding
- Foaled: 1834
- Owner: John Elmore
- Trainer: George Dockeray

Major wins
- Grand National (1842)

Gaylad (foaled 1834) was a racehorse that beat fourteen rivals to win the 1842 Grand National, ridden by Tom Olliver. It won in a time of 13 minutes 30 seconds.

== Racing career ==
Gaylad was trained by George Dockeray whose Epsom stables had also prepared Lottery and Jerry when they had won. Gaylad's owner at the time of the Grand National was Piccadilly horse trader John Elmore who already had a Grand National winner with Lottery. Gaylad was ridden by Tom Olliver, who was one of the most experienced riders in the race, as this was his fourth ride after finishing second in 1839 while riding Seventy Four. Olliver would go on to win again the following year with Vanguard.

Elmore sold Gaylad at Tattersall's on 4 July 1844, receiving 950 guineas for the horse. Gaylad was still racing in 1848.

== Name ==
Gaylad was a term at the time for a young man with a fondness for a hedonistic lifestyle. Gaylad is sometimes recorded in modern historical accounts as Gay Lad; both spellings were used interchangeably at the time. The pronunciation is thought to have sounded as one word with two syllables and a silent y, like 'galad'.

== Grand National record ==
Grand National	Position	Jockey	Age	Weight	SP	Distance
1842	1st	Tom Olliver	8	12–00	7/1	
