= 1839 in sports =

1839 in sports describes the year's events in world sport.

== Boxing ==
Events

- 12 February — William "Bendigo" Thompson defeats James Burke, who is disqualified for head butting.
- Jem Ward finally relinquishes his claim to the English Championship title and awards a championship belt to Bendigo.
- Bendigo suffers a serious knee injury while doing somersaults during a celebration and cannot fight again for several years.
- The English title is again disputed and claims to it are made by Burke, Ben Caunt and Nicholas Ward, brother of Jem Ward.

== Cricket ==
Events

- 1 March — formation of Sussex County Cricket Club out of the Sussex Cricket Fund organisation that had been set up in 1836; Sussex is the oldest county club
- 10–11 June — Sussex CCC plays its inaugural first-class match versus Marylebone Cricket Club (MCC) at Lord's

England

- Most runs – Ned Wenman 332 @ 18.44 (HS 58)
- Most wickets – James Cobbett 85 (BB 8–?)

== Football ==
Events

- A former Rugby School pupil, Albert Pell, begins organising football matches at Cambridge University. Because of the different school variations, a compromise set of rules has to be found and this is the origin of the famous Cambridge Rules that will be published in 1863.
- It is claimed that Barnes RFC is founded in 1839 but there is no actual evidence. If the claim is true, Barnes is the world's oldest football club (all codes).

== Horse racing ==
Events

- The 1839 Grand National is acknowledged to be the first official running of the race, the three earlier races being termed the Great Liverpool Steeplechase

England

- Grand National – Lottery
- 1,000 Guineas Stakes – Cara
- 2,000 Guineas Stakes – The Corsair
- The Derby – Bloomsbury
- The Oaks – Deception
- St. Leger Stakes – Charles XII

== Rowing ==
The Boat Race

- 3 April — Cambridge wins the 3rd Oxford and Cambridge Boat Race

Other events

- The first Henley Regatta is held on the River Thames by the town of Henley-on-Thames, England. From 1851 it will be the Henley Royal Regatta.
- The Detroit Boat Club is established on the Detroit River in Michigan. Eventually it will be the oldest sporting club in America.
