= George Dockeray =

British jockey and racehorse trainer

Personal information
- Born: 1789 Carshalton
- Died: 1857 (aged 67–68)
- Occupation: Jockey

Horse racing career
- Sport: Horse racing

Major racing wins
- Major races (as jockey); Ascot Gold Cup (1826); Epsom Derby (1826); Epsom Oaks (1829); Major races (as trainer); Grand National (1839, 1840, 1842, 1852)

Significant horses
- Chateau Margaux, Gaylad, Green Mantle, Jerry, Lap-dog, Lottery, Miss Mowbray

George Dockeray (1789–1857) was a British jockey and racehorse trainer.

His big race wins as a jockey included Lap-dog, the winner of the 1826 Epsom Derby, Chateau Margaux, the Ascot Gold Cup winner of the same year, and Green Mantle, the 1829 Oaks winner. He was also an early example of jockeys riding in races internationally, when, in the late 1820s, he and fellow jockey Sam Day, spent time race-riding in Brussels, Belgium.

After retiring as a jockey, he trained horses from stables in Church Street, Epsom, Surrey. His training success included the first-ever Grand National winner, Lottery, and three further National winners – Jerry (1840), Gaylad (1842) and Miss Mowbray (1852). He also trained flat horses, including Adine, winner of the Goodwood Stakes, Ebor Handicap and Yorkshire Oaks. In addition to this success, he had a reputation for being "as honest and faithful a trainer as any".

He died in Epsom in 1857.

== Major wins (as jockey) ==
(United Kingdom) Great Britain

- Ascot Gold Cup – Chateau Margaux (1826)
- Epsom Derby – Lap-dog (1826)
- Epsom Oaks – Green Mantle (1829)

== Major wins (as trainer) ==
(United Kingdom) Great Britain

- Grand National – Lottery (1839), Jerry (1840), Gaylad (1842), Miss Mowbray (1852)
