= Gaylad =

Gaylad may refer to:

- The Gaylads, band
- Gaylad (horse)
