= 1839 Grand National =

English steeplechase horse race

- Grand National
- Location: Aintree
- Date: 26 February 1839
- Winning horse: Lottery
- Starting price: 9/1
- Jockey: Jem Mason
- Trainer: (England) George Dockeray
- Owner: John Elmore
- Conditions: Heavy

The 1839 Grand Liverpool Steeplechase was the first official annual running of a steeplechase which later became known as the Grand National.

It was held at Aintree Racecourse near Liverpool, England, on Tuesday 26 February 1839 and attracted a field of 17 runners.

Although recorded by the press at the time as the fourth running of the Grand Liverpool Steeplechase, which was renamed the Grand National in 1847, the first three runnings were poorly organised affairs possibly run at Maghull. This year the race came under new management and the arrival of the railway in Liverpool made travel to the course easier.

The race was not run as a handicap chase (the Grand National was converted to a handicap race in 1843) and therefore all the runners carried twelve stone.

== Competitors and betting ==
Eighteen runners were declared to run in the race but shortly before the start Jerry was withdrawn. This left the field as follows:

Horse	Age	SP	Jockey	Note
The Nun (mare)	10	6/1 favourite	Allen McDonough	Jockey won the previous year's race; he was taking his third ride in the race.
Rust	9	7/1	William McDonough	Jockey was one of fifteen riders not to have competed before.
Daxon	6	8/1	Tom Ferguson	
Lottery	9	9/1	James Mason	
Railroad	6	9/1	A Powell	
Seventy Four	6	12/1	Tom Olliver	
Paulina (mare)	9	12/1	Mr. Martin	
True Blue	8	12/1	P Barker	
Pioneer	11	12/1	T Walker	
Jack	7	12/1	Henry Wadlow	
Cannon Ball	10	12/1	Johnnie Newcombe	
Charity (mare)	9	20/1	N Hardy	
Conrad	11	20/1	Capt. Martin Becher	Provided a third ride in the race for Becher who had won the race in 1836 on The Duke.
Barkston	11		Mr. Wilmot	Not quoted by bookmakers.
Cramp	6		Larry Byrne	Not quoted by bookmakers.
Dictator			Robert Carlin	Not quoted by bookmakers.
Rambler	8		J Morgan	Not quoted by bookmakers.

== The race ==
The start was situated near to where the modern day Melling Road is and took the runners out into open countryside, jumping a line of natural banks, no more than 2 feet (0.61 m) high before reaching a post and rails over a brook. They then took the runners left towards the Leeds and Liverpool Canal, turning sharply (where the modern day Canal Turn is) to run along the canalside back towards the racecourse, negotiating the Second Brook (the modern day Valentine's Brook). The runners would then enter the 'racecourse proper' at the far end of the circuit to run back towards the stands, jumping a plain fence (the modern day Chair) before jumping a wall topped with gorse (the modern day Water Jump). The field then took another circuit of the course, this time bypassing the final two obstacles towards the finishing post.

Paulina refused the first jump but continued after being put at the fence a second time. The most famous incident of the race occurred at the fence then known as the First Brook. Captain Becher had taken Conrad into second place at this stage but his mount failed to clear the rails and fell. Becher was forced to dive for cover into the brook itself as the other horses cleared the obstacle and legend has it that he was heard to tell the spectators that he did not realise how filthy water tasted without the benefit of whisky.

Seconds later, William McDonough joined Becher in the brook after falling from Rust but it was the Captain's name attributed to the fence, now known as Becher's Brook. Both riders remounted but Becher's race ended when his mount fell again at the Second Brook where both Barkston and Cannon Ball had also fallen. It was one of these horses, while running loose, who ended the hopes of the favourite when The Nun was brought down shortly before rejoining the racecourse; she was remounted by Tom Ferguson while Rust was pulled up before reaching the stands. Charity fell at the wall in front of the stands but was also remounted.

Railroad led at this stage with Lottery in second place but so slow was the pace of the race and so wide the distances between competitors that the favourite The Nun had managed to make up ground to move into third. Seventy-Four was fourth.

On the second circuit, Charity fell before reaching the First Brook for the second time while Dictator fell at the fence situated at the turn by the canal but was quickly remounted by Robert Carlin. Daxon and The Nun both fell for a second time at the next fence, the Second Brook, while Dictator fell there again, this time fatally, becoming the first equine fatality of the Grand National

Jem Mason took Lottery into the lead at the First Brook and maintained it to the finish, winning more easily than the three-length margin suggested in a time of 14 minutes 53 seconds, 53 seconds outside the course record. Lottery was prepared for the race at the stables of George Dockeray in Epsom, who is loosely regarded as the trainer but most of the preparation was more likely conducted by the owner, Piccadilly horse dealer John Elmore in whose colours of blue jacket and black cap the jockey rode. Seventy-Four was second, Paulina third and True Blue fourth. Pioneer was on course to finish third when he unseated his rider. Walker quickly remounted but could only manage fifth place.

== Aftermath ==
Although regarded at the time as the fourth running of the Grand Liverpool Steeplechase, this running went on to be regarded as the first official running of the Grand National. The finishing order was only loosely recorded in the press as Jack in sixth, The Nun seventh, Railroad eighth, Rambler ninth and Cramp the last of ten to pass the post. Later record books show seven finishers though this is not supported by any press reports from the time. There was also much criticism in the press over the severity of the event, especially the conduct of Robert Carlin in remounting Dictator when witnesses described the horse as distressed. His cause of death was recorded as a burst blood vessel.

== Original colours ==
For many years it was believed that the silks worn by Mason were blue with black cap. However, when the original silks were restored and presented to the Aintree museum, they were found to have actually been scarlet. It was found that John Elmore changed his colours to blue in the late 1840s, which led to the mistaken belief.

== Finishing order ==
Position	Horse	Jockey	Age	SP	Distance
01	Lottery	Jem Mason	9	9/1	3 lengths
02	Seventy-Four	Tom Olliver	6	12/1	3 lengths
03	Paulina	S. Martin	9	12/1	3 lengths
04	True Blue	P Barker	8	12/1	
05	Pioneer	T Walker	11	12/1	
06	Jack	Henry Wadlow	7	12/1	
07	The Nun	Allen McDonough	10	6/1 F	
08	Railroad	Horatio Powell	6	9/1	
09	Rambler	J Morgan	8	NQ	
10	Cramp	Wilmot	6	NQ	

*NQ = not quoted

== Non finishers ==
Fence	Horse	Jockey	Age	SP	Fate
17	Rust	William McDonough	9	7/1	Fell at First Brook, remounted; pulled up after first circuit
09 (Valentine's)	Conrad	Capt. Martin Becher	11	20/1	Fell at First Brook, remounted; fell at Second Brook
09 (Valentine's)	Barkston	Larry Byrne	11	NQ	Fell at Second Brook
06 (Becher's Brook)	Cannon Ball	Johnnie Newcombe	10	12/1	Fell at First Brook
17	Charity	N Hardy	9	20/1	Fell at the wall, remounted; fell again early on second circuit
25 (Valentine's)	Daxon	Tom Ferguson	6	8/1	Fell at Second Brook on second circuit
25 (Valentine's)	Dictator	Robert Carlin		NQ	Fell at Second Brook on second circuit, remounted but fell again and broke blood vessel at the third brook {Fatal}

*NQ = not quoted
