= Goblin (disambiguation) =

A goblin is a creature from European folklore.

Goblin may also refer to:

== Goblin characters ==
- Another name for orcs in the Middle-earth universe of J. R. R. Tolkien
- Goblin (Dungeons & Dragons), a fictional humanoid creature in the Dungeons & Dragons role-playing game
- Goblins (Harry Potter), creatures in the fictional Harry Potter world
- Goblin (Marvel Comics), various goblin-themed fictional characters appearing in comic books published by Marvel Comics
- Goblin (Warhammer), a race in the Warhammer games
- Goblins, various troops commonly featured throughout the mobile games Clash of Clans and Clash Royale
- Goblin, a fictional spirit from Brave Animated Series by Yellow Book
- Goblin, a fictional spirit companion of Tarquin Blackwood from The Vampire Chronicles series by Anne Rice
- El Goblino, a fictional character from the Roblox game Doors.

== Arts and entertainment ==
=== Music ===
- Goblin (band), an Italian progressive rock band
- Goblin (album), a 2011 album and title song by Tyler, the Creator
- Orange Goblin, a British heavy metal band
- "Goblin", a 2014 song by Opeth on their album Pale Communion
- "Goblin", a 2019 song by Sulli

=== Films, television shows and stage play ===
- Goblin (film), a 2010 film directed by Jeffery Scott Lando
- The Goblins, a stage play by Sir John Suckling that premiered in 1638
- Guardian: The Lonely and Great God, also known as Goblin, a 2016 South Korean TV series
- Troll 2, a 1990 B-horror movie produced under the title Goblins

=== Other media ===
- Goblins (webcomic), written and illustrated by Ellipsis Horner
- Goblin, a fictional yacht in the 1937 book We Didn't Mean to Go to Sea by Arthur Ransome
- "Goblin (Favorite Boys)", a 2020 song by A.C.E

== Transportation ==
- McDonnell XF-85 Goblin, an experimental aircraft
- de Havilland Goblin (Halford H-1), an early jet engine
- Gospel Oak to Barking line (GOBLIN), a railway line in north-east London, UK
- Grumman G-23 fighter aircraft, known as the Goblin in Canadian service

== Plants and animals ==
- Glyptauchen panduratus, also known as the goblin fish
- Goblin (chimpanzee), a chimpanzee who is featured in several books and documentaries
- Goblin shark, a deep-sea species
- Oonopidae, a spider family also known as Goblin spiders
- A horse that finished fifth in the 1841 and 1843 Grand Nationals

== Other ==
- Goblin (voice actor)
- Goblinus, bishop of Transylvania (r. 1376–1386)
- Dmitry Puchkov (born 1961), nicknamed Goblin, Russian media personality
- Goblin Vacuum Cleaners, a British brand and a generic term for a vacuum cleaner dating from 1930s Britain
- Goblin Valley State Park, Utah, U.S.
- Goblin Combe, a valley in Somerset, England
- 541132 Leleākūhonua, nicknamed The Goblin, a trans-Neptunian object

== See also ==
- Gobelins (disambiguation)
- Gobliiins, a series of adventure video games by Coktel Vision
