= Goblin King (disambiguation) =

A goblin king is a king of goblins, such as found in European folklore.

Goblin king may also refer to:

== Characters ==
- Sōjōbō, a Japanese mythological character that is supposed to live on Mount Kurama
- Jareth, a character from the 1986 film Labyrinth
- Goblin King, a character from Marvel Comics, a supervillain alter-ego taken up by multiple characters
- Goblin King, a character from the 2012 film The Hobbit: An Unexpected Journey based on the Great Goblin from The Hobbit
- King of the Goblins, a character from the picturebook Hershel and the Hanukkah Goblins
- Goblin King, a character from the light novel series Grimgar of Fantasy and Ash
- Goblin King, a character from the 2008 film Scooby-Doo! and the Goblin King
- Gorkil, a character from the 2006 video game The Lord of the Rings: The Battle for Middle-earth II
- Goblin King, a character from the 2018 television series Legend of the Three Caballeros
- King of Goblins, a character from the 1995 video game Stonekeep
- The Goblin King, a character from the 2023 Doctor Who Christmas special "The Church on Ruby Road"

== Other uses ==
- Sergey Aksyonov (born 1972), a Russian politician nicknamed "Goblin" and "Goblin King"
- The Goblin King (book), a graphic novel published by Graphic Universe
- "Goblin King" (song), a 2016 song from the film The Huntsman: Winter's War
- King Goblin, a beer from Wychwood Brewery

== See also ==
- Goblin (disambiguation)
- King (disambiguation)
