= 1852 Grand National =

English steeplechase horse race

- Grand National
- Location: Aintree
- Date: 3 March 1852
- Winning horse: Miss Mowbray
- Starting price: 50/1
- Jockey: Mr Alec Goodman
- Trainer: (England) George Dockeray
- Owner: T. F. Mason
- Conditions: Good

The 1852 Grand National was the 14th renewal of the Grand National horse race that took place at Aintree near Liverpool, England, on 3 March 1852. The winning jockey, Alec Goodman, later rode the 1866 winner.

== The Course ==
Two changes were made to the course from the previous year as the hedge out of Proceeds Lane, which had been fence sixteen and was jumped once, was removed. Although the Lane remained slightly sunken, it was no longer considered an obstacle on the course. Over future years the lane would gradually level out and develop into Melling Road. After the press were scathing of the Water Jump, fence 15, Lord Sefton ordered it to be measured. It was recorded as being 13 feet, 6 inches wide with a 3 foot rail and four foot deep brook.

Start At the field adjacent to the wheat field beyond the lane, Fence 1 {16} Ditch, Fence 2 {17} Low stump hedge and drain, Fence 3 {18} Post and Rails, Fence 4 {19} Old dead hedge with partial ditch on approach, Fence 5 {20} Becher's Brook, Fence 6 {21} Bank, Fence 7 {22} Bank and ditch, Fence 8 {23} Extreme Turn, Fence 9 {24} Valentine's Brook, Fence 10 {25} Hedge, Fence 11 {26} Post and rails, Fence 12 {27} Ditch, Fence 13 {28} Hedge at Canal Bridge. The runners then turned at the first opportunity on re-entering the racecourse and made towards the fences in front of the stands. Fence 14 Made Fence at the back of the distance chair, Fence 15 Water jump 13' 6" wide with a 3' high rail and 4' brook, measured on order of Lord Sefton after claims the fence had been dangerously enlarged The runners then crossed Proceeds Lane and over the wheat field, before following the same circuit until reaching the racecourse again. This time the runners continued to the wider extreme of the course before turning to run up the straight in front of the stands. Fence 29 New hurdles, Fence 30 Long length hurdles, Fence 31 Distance hurdles. The runners then bypassed the Made Fence and Water Jump on the inside before reaching the winning post in front of the Main Stand.

== Leading Contenders ==
The market this year was one of the closest the racegoing public had seen for a National, with four horses being co favourite the night before the race.

La Gazza Ladra proved the choice of the racegoers on the day, backing her from 12/1 in to 6/1 favourite, due to her winning last year's Irish Metropolitan Chase and being rather lightly treated by the handicapper. She was considered easily the fastest horse in the race and racing journalist, Whalebone remarked that she could surely not be beaten if first over the final flight. Her rider, J Neale ran a patient race, surviving a Collison at Becher's first time and keeping the favourite well to the fore, even taking a pull coming onto the Canal side second time to save some energy. Despite this, Neale found his mount had little to offer coming back onto the race course and she faded to finish fifth.

Abd El Kader was aiming to complete a treble of victories but his doubters felt he had been harshly treated by the handicapper, while also being seemingly unable to run well anywhere but Aintree. Despite that, and jockey, Denny Wynne putting up a lb over, the public backed him down to 9/1 on the course. After running prominently on the first circuit, Little Ab was among a host of runners who quickly found the pace too hot crossing the wheat field to start the second circuit. Wynne found his mount's stride rapidly shortening and pulled up before reaching Becher's

Chieftain had been tipped as a good National horse since the previous November and was backed down from 20/1 to 12/1 at Tattersalls during February Being tipped to win by the Racing Correspondent of the Liverpool Mail in the days before the race served to further strengthen his position and he was made clear favourite on the morning of the race before being sent off 10/1. His owner/rider, E S Harrison set out to stake a pillar to post victory and stayed around five lengths clear for most of the race until the searing pace his rider set began to tell as they reached the racecourse for the second time. The horse had nothing left turning into the straight but rallied slightly to finish fourth, with many in the press believing he would have won under a more skilful rider.

Victress was a long time anti post favourite and had been considered better than Miss Mowbray when the pair were stable companions. Her new trainer, Saunders was highly thought of but public support cooled in the days before the race. Henry Bradley took the ride, which ended when his mount was cannoned into and fell at Becher's first time.

Warner found favour when Lord Waterford declared to win with him over Aintree specialist, Sir John. William Archer took the ride and was in contention when blundering away his chance at the bank after Becher's, never being able to get back on terms before finishing sixth.

Cogia was surprisingly well supported despite many of the pundits considering her to be nothing more than a decent hurdler. John Tasker took the ride and quickly found that the pundits were right, doing well to stay in the saddle when his mount crashed through the third fence post and rails before being deposited in an equally bad jump at Becher's

Maria Day had been a shadow of the horse that so narrowly missed winning the National the previous year and was thought to be unlikely to run. However, once confirmed she would line up, she received a lot of late support from backers feeling Aintree was her course. Jockey, John Frisby was almost shunted by a terrible jump from the horse at the first fence and the experienced rider immediately decided she wasn't right and pulled her up before the second.

Miss Mowbray was another that had been on the names of tipsters since the turn of the year, when some had got on her at prices as long as 40/1. Come race day she completed the quintet sent off at 12s, largely on the back of a good run in her previous race at Leamington and her trainer, George Dockeray's belief that she was a stone well in with the handicapper. Although among the ten riders making the National debut, amateur farmer, Alec Goodman was a well known and respected horseman who kept his mount out of trouble and was content to let the rapidly tiring Chieftain lead his mount down the straight before sweeping past at the final hurdle to claim victory in a well judged run.

== The Race ==
The Grand National was the only Steeplechase on the five race card and, as in most recent years, the weighing out process proved so laborious that the day trippers from south of Birmingham were forced to leave the course for Lime Street station before the National was sent off.

The delay was increased when Lord Sefton called a false start after Royal Blue was left at a standstill before the field got away cleanly at the second attempt.

Maley was first to show and led the field over the first fence where Maria Day almost fell, dropping her legs into the ditch and convincing John Frisby that she should be pulled up.

Abd El Kader took it up going to the third fence, the post and rails, ahead of Chieftain and Maley while Cogia failed to rise at all and ploughed through it, John Tasker doing well to stay on board. However, his reprieve was short lived, his mount making a worse blunder at Becher's first time and leaving him no chance, while the bunching to get a got position saw a clash between Bourton, Royal Blue, La Gazza Ladra and Victress, the latter horse being brought down.

Maley, Peter Simple and the 5 year old Bedford joined the casualties at the bank beyond while Ægis took exception to the post and rails on the Canal side, refusing and bolting, throwing Tom Olliver in the process, while 6 year old Bedford crashed into a post beside the Canal Bridge and gave Ablett a very heavy fall, though fortunately he avoided the broken thigh suffered by Daly in a similar fall two years earlier.

Chieftain's rider, Harrison had set out to make all and pushed a frightening pace down the Canal side, opening up a five length lead over Everton jumping the Canal Bridge. His lead was increased to seven lengths when his nearest rival all but fell and was brought to a standstill as Abd El Kader moved into second, holding a two length advantage over La Gazza Ladra, in turn three lengths ahead of Warner, Bourton, Royal Blue, Maurice Daley, Miss Mowbray, Sir Peter Laurie, Sir John, Lamienne and Carrig in the main group with Dollys Brae, McIon and Silent Friend struggling to stay in touch and the remounted Peter Simple toiling at the rear.

The main field took closer order going to the fences in front of the stand with Chieftain still bowling along, seven lengths clear of the main group, who all took the Chair and Water in good style, with only the tailed off Silent Friend unseating Parry at the Chair before finding the removal of the burden of a jockey to be a great assistance, setting off in pursuit of the runners into the second circuit.

Chieftain continued to set a murderous pace over the once infamous Proceeds Lane, which no longer had the fence at it, which had caused so many refusals in the '40s. The wheat field beyond the lane proved the undoing of Abd El Kader and Royal Blue both dropping out of contention over the fences going down to Becher's, by which time both, along with the tailed off Dolly's Brae and Everton were pulled up. Bourton was also in trouble, and after being almost brought down by the loose Silent Friend decided their day was also run, while Peter Simple also gave in, having never been able to get back into contention from his earlier fall.

At the brook the favourite La Gazza Ladra appeared to be cantering and briefly closed on Chieftain but jockey, Neale opted to let the runaway leader continue to bowl along in front, seeing that Harrison had almost run his mount to a standstill and would be unlikely to last home. Warner's chances all but ended with a bad mistake at the bank beyond while McIon was less fortunate, rolling over the bank and out of the contest.

Chieftain continued to hold a strong lead down the Canal side, with only La Gazza Ladra, Maurice Daley, Carrig, Miss Mowbray, Lamienne, Sir Peter Laurie and the slightly adrift Sir John and Warner still in the contest, all their riders seemingly content that the runaway leader wouldn't last home.

Turning onto the course to line up for the hurdles Miss Mowbray, Maurice Daley and Sir Peter Laurie all moved up to the leader while La Gazza Ladra and the remainder were unable to find anything extra and were now running on for minor places.

The long time leader was finally reeled in at the final hurdle by his three pursuers with Miss Mowbray holding a slender lead over Maurice Daley and Sir Peter Laurie. However, none of the three could quicken away, and with Chieftain and La Gazz Ladra rallying, the run in became a five horse race.

Miss Mowbray lasted home to win with a length between each of her chasers, Maurice Daley, Sir Peter Laurie, Chieftain and La Gazza Ladra. Warner, Sir John, Lamienne and Carrig were the only others to finish.

== Finishing Order ==
Position	Name	Jockey	Handicap (st-lb)	SP	Distance	Colours
Winner	Miss Mowbray	Alec Goodman	10-4	12-1*	9 mins 58.5 secs	Light blue, white cap
Second	Maurice Daley {Formerly Flycatcher}	Charlie Boyce	9-4 {carried 9-6}	15-1	1 length	Scarlet, black cap
Third	Sir Peter Laurie	Bill Holman	11-2	30-1	1 length	Black, white sleeves and cap
Fourth	Cheiftain	E. Harrison	10-12	10-1	1 length	White, black sleeves and cap
Fifth	La Gazza Ladra	J. Neale	9-12	6-1	1 length	Scarlet, purple cap
Sixth	Warner	William Archer	10-8	12-1		Light blue, black cap
Seventh	Sir John	Johnny Ryan	11-10	20-1		Light blue, black cap
Eighth	Lamienne	Dan Meaney	9-7	NQ		Scarlet, white cap
Ninth and last	Carrig	Jack Debeau	10-4 {carried 11-0}	30/1	Fell Final Hurdle, Remounted	Blue, black cap
Fence 21 [Bank]	McIon	J. Sadler	9-10	50-1	Fell	Blue, white cap
Fence 20 Becher's Brook	Abd El Kader	Denny Wynne	11-4	9/1	Pulled Up	Yellow, black cap
Fence 20 [Becher's Brook]	Bourton	Sam Darling	10-10	20/1	Pulled Up	Black, harlequin sleeves, black cap
Fence 20 [Becher's Brook]	Royal Blue	George Stevens	9-0	100-1	Pulled Up	White, black cap
Fence 14 [Made fence The Chair]	Silent Friend	J. Parry	9-12	NQ	Unseated Rider when tailed off	Purple, buff sleeves, black cap
Fence 14 [Made Fence]	Everton	J. Hewitt	9-6 [carried 9-10]	NQ	Tailed off, Pulled up before Fence 20 [Becher's Brook]	Scarlet, black cap
Fence 13 [Canal Bridge]	6 Year Old Bedford	T. Ablett	10-10	20/1	Unstead rider when hit a post	Scarlet, white cap
Fence 12 [Ditch]	Dolly's Brae	W Magee	10-0	NQ	Tailed off, Pulled up fence 20 [Becher's Brook]	Black, plum cap
Fence 11 [Post and Rails]	Ægis	Tom Olliver	10-10	NQ	Refused	White, Black sleeves and cap
Fence 6 [Bank]	5 Year Old Bedford	A Taylor	9-12	20/1	Fell	Peach, black cap
Fence 6 [Bank]	Peter Simple	E.S. Davenport	11-2	30/1	Fell, Remounted Tailed off and Pulled up Fence 20 [Becher's Brook]	Burgundy, black cap
Fence 6 [Bank]	Maley	J. Connor	9-6	NQ	Fell	White, red cap
Fence 5 Becher's Brook	Victress	Henry Bradley	9-7	12/1	Baulked and Fell	Green & white stripes, black cap
Fence 5 [Becher's Brook]	Cogia	John Tasker	9-6 [carried 9-9]	12-1	Fell	White, purple sleeves, red cap
Fence 2 [Low stump hedge and drain]	Maria Day	John Frisby	10-6	12/1	Pulled Up	Yellow, purple cap

- Contemporary reports regarding starting prices are often in conflict as different papers took their prices from differing sources. The only dedicated sporting newspaper to cover the race was Bell's London Life. The prices listed here are taken from their returns and report. Those not listed in the betting are referred to as Not Quoted. Bookmakers would have listed these on the day as 'any price these others' meaning they would take any reasonable price requested by the backer. This would probably have been between 100 and 250/1.

There were two competitors named Bedford. The press distinguished between them by their age.

== Aftermath ==
For the third consecutive year all the horses returned safely while the only rider requiring treatment on the course was Ablett, badly shaken from his mount colliding with a post in an accident remarkably similar to that which had broken James Daly's leg two years earlier.

The press hailed the skill and patience of Alec Goodman for his victory, comparing it to the riding of Chieftain by Harrison who was said to have ridden the horse to a standstill and that he would have won with even common judgement. Harrison had the chance to redeem himself six days later in the Doncaster Grand National but yet again adopted the same tactics until being dislodged by a spectator on the course. Miss Mowbray herself was far from the fluent jumper she had been at Aintree and survived two bad mistakes before being beaten by Sir Peter Laurie, with Tom Olliver in the saddle.

The London press exclaimed the Liverpool Grand National as easily the biggest race of its kind in the country but warned that the now common inability of the race organisers to start the race on time, usually due to delays weighing out the riders, could impact on the number of visitors from London and the South in the future as they were having to leave for Lime Street Station's last train to London before or during the race. The provision of better facilities for the riders, trainers and press was among their suggestions.

The railway arrangements too came in for more criticism. While the dangerous overcrowding witnessed the previous year had been resolved by more frequent trains, the fact that those who wished to board the final train out of Lime Street for London were all forced to pay a first class fare was seen as adding misery for those who'd already had to leave the course before the conclusion of the National. Reporting on another modern innovation, the fact the result had reached London twenty minutes after the conclusion of the race was seen as a marvel, considering the telegraph office itself was in Liverpool and the messenger had to negotiate the crowds before making it to the city to send the message.
