= 1866 Grand National =

English steeplechase horse race

- Grand National
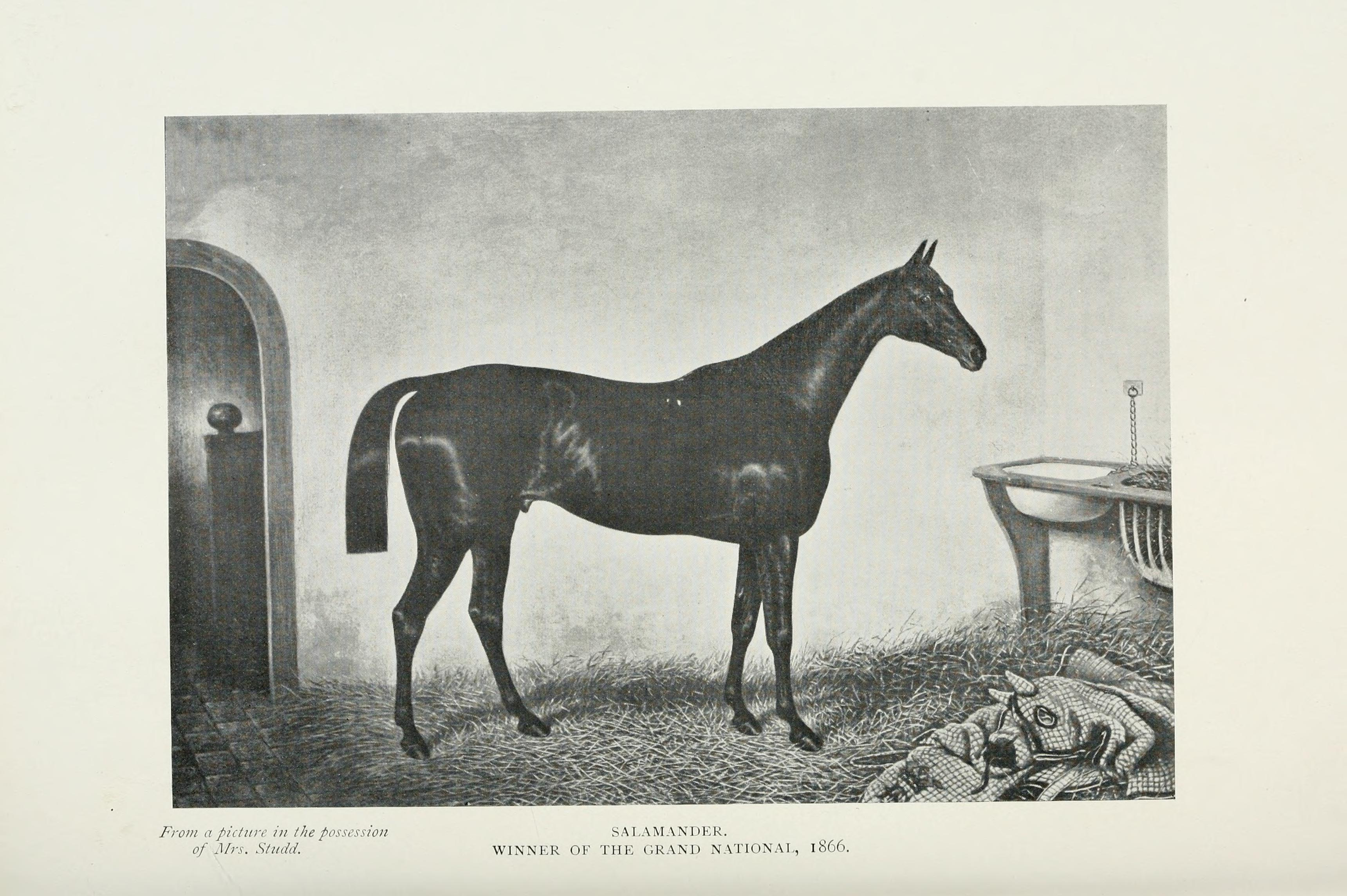
- Salamander (from Heroes and heroines of the Grand National)
- Location: Aintree
- Date: 7 March 1866
- Winning horse: Salamander
- Starting price: 40/1
- Jockey: Mr Alec Goodman
- Trainer: J. Walters
- Owner: Edward Studd
- Conditions: Soft (snowy)

The 1866 Grand National was the 28th renewal of the Grand National horse race that took place at Aintree near Liverpool, England, on 7 March 1866.

The winning jockey, Alec Goodman, had also ridden the 1852 winner.

== The Course ==
First circuit: Fence 1 {15} Ditch Fence 2 {16} Ditch and Bank, Fence 3 {17} Double Rails, Fence 4 {18} Rails and Ditch, Fence 5 {19} Becher's Brook Fence 6 {20} Post and Rails, Fence 7 {21} Post and Rails Fence 8 {22} Extreme Turn, often referred to as the Canal Turn in previous years, Fence 9 {23} Valentine's Brook, Fence 10 {24} Ditch and Quickset, Fence 11 {25} Post and Rails, Fence 12 {26} Stump Hedge and Ditch.

The runners then crossed the lane at the canal bridge to re-enter the racecourse proper, turning at the first opportunity towards the fences in front of the stands. Fence 13 Gorse Hurdle, Fence 14 Artificial Water Jump.

Second circuit: The runners then turned away from the Grandstands again and crossed what had been known in the 1850s as Proceed's Lane, following the same circuit until reaching the racecourse again. This time the runners continued to the wider extreme of the course before turning to run up the straight in front of the stands where Fence 27 Hurdle had to be jumped.

The runners then bypassed the Gorsed Hurdle and Artificial Water Jump inside before reaching the winning post in front of the Main Stand.

== Leading Contenders ==
Laura was sent off as the 7/1 favourite, having looked very good in prep runs in Liverpool in the week ahead of the race. While many newspaper pundits agreed she had a great chance, only Don John in the Sporting Times named her outright as his tip to win the race. Harry Lamplugh was making his first appearance in the race since riding Huntsman to victory four years earlier.

Cortolvin went off at 8/1, having proven himself a strong contender in heavy going at Croydon in the weeks leading up to the National. Twenty-two year old Johnny Page took his second ride in the race, having completed a circuit on Joe Maley the previous year.

Alcibiade was 9/1 to defend his crown from 1865, but was deprived of his partner in victory as Bee Coventry arrived at Aintree with his arm in a sling from a recent fall. The vacant ride offered Ben Land a great chance at the seventh attempt to improve on having finished second twice.

Real Jam saw his price fall to 12/1 on the back of his trainer, rider, Di Hughes steering him to victory in the Annual Hurdle twenty-four hours before the National. This was despite the pairing having failed to complete the course in two previous attempts.

L'Africain at 100/7 was backed despite having a welter weight to carry of 13 stone 2lbs. George Holman would have no worries about making the weight for his fourth crack at the race, his previous best being a fourth placed finish.

In a very open contest there was also heavy support for Creole at 15/1, The Doctor at 20/1 and Ibex, Merrimac and Mistake at 25/1.

Among the outsiders was last year's runner up, Hall Court at 30/1 along with King Of Hearts, Salamander at 40/1 and a host of other chances at 50/1 including Effenberg, a first contender from Germany, Garotter and Thomastown representing Ireland, Philosopher, Stella and one horse that didn't have a name, being referred to by the press as The Emma Gelding.

== The Race ==
Sir William was inspired by the antics of Acrobat last year and followed suit, refusing to start until the rest of the field were almost at the first fence and although eventually encouraged to start, was quickly pulled up.

Thomastown, Creole, West End, Mistake and Ace Of Hearts were among the leaders going into the first fence where Ibex fell. However, Ace Of Hearts made to refuse at the second fence and, in so doing, caused half the field to either fall, refuse or just get stopped, including L'Africain aho collided with King Of Hearts both coming down along with many others including West End and Reporter. Mistake made to refuse at the third fence and cause more carnage with Laura, Stella and Philosopher among those all badly hampered.

Approaching the fourth fence the field had been reduced to half with Creole leading Alcibiade, Merrimac, Mistake, Thomastown, Salamander, Lightheart, Real Jam, Cortolvin, The Doctor, Milltown, Frank, The Emma Gelding, Garotter and Hall Court. The remainder were busy trying to remount or be put at either fence two or three again.

Becher's Brook claimed Milltown while the remounted Cutler was already tailed off when falling at the Canal Turn. Hall Court's race ended with a heavy fall at the Ditch and Quickset after Valentine's, taking Garotter out in the process to leave just a main body of twelve runners to re-enter the racecourse well clear of another half dozen or so who were persevering after the earlier melees.

Creole had opened up a strong lead but, and took the fences in front of the stands ahead of Mistake, while third placed Alcibiade was being harassed by two loose horses to the point that jockey, Ben Land had to take his whip to them to avoid being brought down. Salamander, Merrimac, Real Jam, Cortolvin, The Emma Gelding followed with a small gap to The Doctor, Lightheart, Frank and Thomastown next, with several others continuing a long way adrift.

Mistake was the first to crack going out onto the second circuit, rapidly dropping back and pulling up while Alcibiade took a heavy fall at the Post and Rails at fence eighteen when trying to challenge Creole who led over Bechers from Merrimac, Cortolvin, Salamander, Real Jam, Thomastown, Lightheart, The Emma Gelding, The Doctor and Frank.

Irish hopes ended with Thomastown falling at Valentines, while the race was effectively reduced to Creole, Lightheart, Salamander, Merrimac, Real Jam and Cortolvin coming along the Canalside.

Salamander moved upsides Creole as the pair led the way back onto the racecourse with Cortolvin also travelling well just behind them and by the time the final hurdle was reached, looked like the only danger to the leader. However, Salamander took the final hurdle cleanly and was never challenged on the run in, winning comfortably by ten lengths with Cortolvin four lengths up on Creole, the trio finishing a distance clear of fourth placed Lightheart. Merrimac, The Doctor and Frank were the only others to pass the judge, havig completed the course.

== Finishing Order ==
Position	Name	Jockey	Handicap (st-lb)	SP	Distance	Colours
Winner	Salamander	Alec Goodman	10-7	40-1	11 mins 5 secs	Scarlet, white sash and cap
Second	Cortolvin	Johnny Page	11-6	8-1	10 lengths	Red, blue sleeves and cap
Third	Creole	George Waddington	10-10	15-1	4 lengths	Red, blue sleeves and cap
Fourth	Lightheart	E. Jones	11-5	100-1	A distance	Pink, white sash and cap
Fifth	Merrimac	Arthur Tempest	10-7	25-1		Blue and white stripes, blue cap
Sixth	The Doctor	George Stevens	10-0	20-1	Walked in	Rose, white cap
Seventh and last to complete the course	Frank	Capt. John {Piggy} Lawrence	11-8	100-1		Green, gold braid, piping and cap
Fence 27 {Final Hurdle}	Real Jam	Di Hughes	10-0	12-1	Pulled Up and walked in.	Light blue, orange cap
Fence 26 {Stump Hedge & Ditch}	The Emma Gelding	J. Holman	10-10	50-1	Pulled Up	Pink, white sleeves and cap
Fence 23 {Valentine's Brook}	Thomastown	James Murphy	11-4	50-1	Fell	Claret, blues sleeves white cap
Fence 18 {Rails & Ditch}	Alcibiade	Ben Land	12-2	9-1	Fell, Remounted Tailed off and walked in	Cherry, yellow spots and cap
Fence 17 {Double Rails}	Mistake	James Knott	10-9	25-1	Pulled Up	Red and blue stripes, black cap
Fence 10 {Ditch & Quickset}	Garotter	G. Ryan	10-7	50-1	Brought Down	Buff, pink cap
Fence 10 {Ditch & Quickset}	Hall Court	Johnny Reeves	11-12	30-1	Fell	Scarlet, white sash and cap
Fence 5 {Becher's Brook}	Milltown	Tommy Pickernell	10-2	100-1	Fell	Black, red cap
Fence 3 {Double Rails}	Cutler	Arthur Thorpe	10-0	100-1	Hampered, Continued Tailed off, Fell Canal Turn, Remounted, Pulled up 2nd circuit	Black, yellow and red stripes, hooped cap
Fence 3 {Double Rails}	King of Hearts	Allen Sadler	10-2	30-1	Brought Down, Continued tailed off, Pulled up after Fence 13	Light blue, black cap
Fence 3 {Double Rails}	Laura	Harry Lamplugh	11-0	7-1 Fav	Brought Down, Remounted tailed off and Pulled up tailed off 2nd circuit.	Pink and white stripes, black cap
Fence 3 {Double Rails}	Stella	Bill Jarvis	10-7	50-1	Hampered and Fell, Remounted Tailed off and Pulled up 2nd circuit	Buff and purple stripes, black cap
Fence 3 {Double Rails}	West End	Walter White	10-5	100-1	Brought Down, continued tailed off, Pulled up end of 1st circuit	Black, red spots and cap
Fence 2 {Ditch & Bank}	Ace of Hearts	George Ede	10-2	100-1	Refused, Continued Tailed off, Pulled up 2nd circuit	Red, blues sleeves, black cap
Fence 2 {Ditch & Bank}	Columbia	William Reeves	10-10	1000-15	Hampered, continued tailed off and Pulled up 2nd circuit.	Pink and white diablo, white cap with pink diamonds
Fence 2 {Ditch & Bank}	Effenburg	R. Twiddy	12-8	50-1	Hampered and Fell, Remounted tailed off and Pulled up tailed off 2nd circuit.	Red, yellow sleeves, red cap
Fence 2 {Ditch & Bank}	Glencairn	James Jewitt	11-4	100-1	Hampered and Fell, Remounted tailed off and Pulled up tailed off 2nd circuit.	Indigo
Fence 2 {Ditch & Bank}	L'Africain	George Holman	13-2	100-7	Hampered and Fell, Remounted Tailed off and Pulled up 2nd circuit	Orange, black cap
Fence 2 {Ditch & Bank}	Philosopher	John Wheeler	10-7	50-1	Fell	Blue, tartan sash, red cap
Fence 2 {Ditch & Bank}	Reporter	A. French	11-4	100-1	Hampered, Tailed off and Pulled up end of the 1st circuit.	Red, blue sleeves, red cap
Fence 2 {Ditch & Bank}	Stanton	Welsh	10-12	50-1	Hampered, Tailed off and hampered again Fence 3, Fell Fence 6	Blue, yellow sash and cap
Fence 1 {Ditch}	Ibex	Charles Boyce	10-12	25-1	Fell	Red, yellow cap
Fence 1 {Ditch}	Sir William	H. Ellison	10-7	100-1	Left at start, tailed off, Pulled up fence 2	Blue, white cap
