= 1843 Grand National =

English steeplechase horse race

- Grand National
- Location: Aintree
- Date: 1 March 1843
- Winning horse: Vanguard
- Starting price: 12/1
- Jockey: (England) Tom Olliver
- Owner: (England) Lord Chesterfield
- Conditions: Good to firm

The 1843 Grand Liverpool Steeplechase was the fifth official annual running of a handicap steeplechase, later to become known as the Grand National Steeplechase handicap horse race which took place at Aintree Racecourse near Liverpool on Wednesday 1 March 1843 and attracted a field of 16 runners.

Although recorded by the press at the time as the eighth running of the Grand Liverpool, which was renamed the Grand National in 1847, the first three runnings were poorly organised affairs and are not currently officially recognised.

This year the race was run as a handicap, with horses weighted according to their ability. In previous years they had all carried the same amount. The National has remained a handicap ever since.

Sixteen horses went to post for the race with nine of the riders making their Grand National debut, while Jem Mason and Tom Olliver were the only riders to have taken part every year since 1839. Along with Bartholomew Bretherton the trio equalled Allen McDonough and Horatio Powell's record of taking part in the feature race at five Aintree Spring meetings. All three riders had won the race, leaving Whitworth, Oldacre and Moore as the only riders, with previous experience, not to have previously won the race.

== The course ==
The course was described by the reporter of the Liverpool Mercury as follows. Start – Just beyond the Melling Road. Fences 1-4 [16-19 on the second circuit] – described as good fences on the run down to Becher's Brook. Fence 5 [20] – Becher's Brook. Although at this time it did not carry the name and was merely described as the brook where the captain had fallen four years earlier. Fences 6, 7 & 8 [21, 22 & 23] – Fences situated across three fields inclined to the left that took the runners towards the Canal side. There is no mention at this time of there being a Canal turn. Fence 9 [24] – A large water jump, which was probably the modern Valentine's Brook. Fences 10, 11 & 12 [25, 26 & 27] – These fences were not described except to say the runner crossed three fields, the third of which was of grass before reaching the Anchor Bridge crossing and running into the training ground, which was the wide extreme of the modern race course proper. Fence 13 – A wall by the distance chair, reintroduced this year at the request of Irish competitors and supporters used to such obstacles in Ireland. Fence 14 – An artificial brook, the modern water jump, which this year was widened and was described as being thirteen feet wide with a rail. Fence 15 – A bank, which took the runners back over into the Melling Road to start the second circuit. Fence 28 – A hurdle situated on the run in beside the wall. On the second circuit the runners turned onto the race course at an earlier point, not running onto the training ground as on the first circuit.

== Finishing order ==
position	name	rider	age	weight	starting price	distance or fate	Colours
Winner	Vanguard	Tom Olliver	8	8-10	12/1	Three lengths Carried out at fence 15 but continued	Red with blue sleeves
Second	Nimrod	Bill Scott	8	11-00	10/1	Half a length	Purple & white stripes
Third	Dragsman	John Crickmere	7	11-03	10/1	Bolted Fence 27	Black with white sleeves
Fourth	Claude Duval	Joe Tomblin		11-07	12/1		White
Fifth	Goblin	Bartholomew Bretherton	12	11-06	10/1	Carried out at Fence 15 but continued	Red
Sixth	Bucephalus	J. Whitworth	11	11-05	Not quoted		Red
Seventh	Lottery	Jem Mason	13	12-06	4/1	Last certain finisher	Red
Non finishers
Fence 28 {Final hurdle}	Peter Simple	John Frisby	9	13-06	3/1 favourite	Refused Fence 15, Walked in having likely not jumped the final hurdle	Red
Fence 26	The Returned	Major D Campbell	9	12-00	4/1	Fell	White
2nd Canal Turn	The Romp	H B Hollinshead	8	11-00	Not quoted	Refused 1st fence, went on, Pulled up	White with blue sleeves
2nd Bechers	Redwing	Thomas Doolan	8	11-10	Not quoted	Pulled up around this point	Light blue
Sunken Lane	Teetotum	W Kennedy	6	11-07	Not quoted	Fell at the Wall and remounted	Light blue
Fence 13 {The Wall}	Tinderbox	G Moore	6	11-07	10/1	Fell and continued loose	
Fence 4	Victoria	T Taylor	6	11-10	Not quoted	Fell and continued loose	
Fence 3	Consul	F Oldacre	11	11-02	Not quoted	Refused at each of the first three fences	

== The Race ==
The most detailed description of the race was given by the reporter of the Liverpool Mercury who stated that Croxby led them out towards the first fence before being passed by Nimrod. Nothing was reported until the fourth fence when Victoria fell and continued riderless before running into the fields inside the course. At this point Peter Simple and Vanguard led the field towards the Canal side of the course, the former increasing the pace on reaching the Canal side plough, which stretched the runners out considerably.

The pace was increased running towards the wall in front of the stands, which Peter Simple and Vanguard took together ahead of Nimrod and Goblin. Teetotum and Tinderbox both fell and the former's jockey, Moore sustained a broken collar bone, which was attended to on the spot. The Returned, Dragsman and Lottery were the only other runners recorded at this point with the loose running Tinderbox being caught by the stables after jumping the brook. Bucephalus, Croxby and Claude Duval were also all still running.

At the bank before the Melling Road, Peter Simple refused and in doing so carried out Vanguard and Goblin, leaving Nimrod in the lead from Dragsman. Vanguard quickly recovered and was back on terms with the two leaders by the time Becher's Brook was reached for the second time. After taking the Water jump at the vicinity of Valentine's Brook, Dragsman opened up a twenty length lead over Vanguard, Nimrod and The Returned, the latter of whom fell and threw Major Campbell a complete somersault three fences from home at a time when the horse was considered to be running as fresh as at the start.

At the penultimate fence at Anchor Bridge, Dragsman made a bad mistake and almost fell, leaving Crickmere clinging around his neck as the horse ran up the road off the course. Vanguard now held a good lead over Nimrod coming back onto the racecourse while Dragsman had recovered and was making up the lost ground with Lottery, Peter Simple, Goblin and Claude Duval all considered still close enough to have a chance.

On the long run from the turn at the top of the course to the final hurdle, Nimrod made up the ground on Vanguard and took the final flight in front. Vanguard overhauled him in the run in to win by two lengths with Dragsman a close third. Four other finishers were recorded as Peter Simple bypassed the final hurdle and walked in. The horses all returned safely with the only injured rider being Mr Moore.

Vanguard was owned by George Stanhope, the 6th Earl of Chesterfield and ran in his red colours with blue sleeves and was trained by his grooms at the Earl's private stables and gallops at Bretby Hall in Derbyshire.

Both Major Campbell and John Crickmere were considered to be very unlucky not to have won, the former falling when going well and the latter having bolted when making a mistake at Anchor Bridge before he was able to get the horse back into the race to finish just three and a half lengths behind the winner. In the winners enclosure Crickmere was telling anyone who would listen how unlucky he was when Tom Olliver responded in jest "But John did we not stop for a smoke at the turn to give you a chance to catch up" Olliver neglected to mention that his own mount had been carried out at the start of the second circuit.
