= Gobelins =

Gobelins may refer to:

- Gobelin, the name of family of dyers, established from the 15th century
- Gobelins Manufactory, a historic tapestry factory in Paris, France
- The 13th arrondissement of Paris, an administrative district containing the Gobelins factory
- Gobelins, l'École de l'image, a school of visual communication and arts in Paris, France
- Les Gobelins station, a Paris Metro station
- Les Gobelins, a former name and nickname of football club Paris 13 Atletico

== See also ==
- Moravská gobelínová manufaktura, a tapestry factory in the Czech Republic
- Goblin (disambiguation)
