= Valentine's Brook =

Fence on Aintree Racecourse

Coordinates: 53.4768°N 2.9302°W

Valentine's Brook is a fence on Aintree Racecourse's National Course and thus is jumped during the Grand National steeplechase which is held annually at the racecourse, located near Liverpool, England. Originally named as the Second Brook, it was renamed after a horse named Valentine was reputed to have jumped the fence hind legs first in 1840. The horse eventually finished third. It is jumped twice during the race, as the 9th and 25th fences.

The fence is similar to, but less daunting than, Becher's Brook, being 5 ft (1.5 m) high and followed by a ditch of 5 ft 6 in (1.68 m). It accounts for around 2% of fallers in the Grand National race. The fence has, however, caused several fatalities in races run over the course, and calls have been made for its removal.
