= Sir William (horse) =

British champion racehorse

Sir William was a champion racehorse. He was the winner of the 1838 Grand Liverpool steeplechase, later to be known as the Grand National. Only three runners took part, with the previous year's winner, The Duke, sent off as 1/2 favourite. He finished last of the three in the race. The winner was ridden by Irishman, Alan McDonogh.
