= Joseph Osborne =

Joseph Osborne was the author of The Horsebreeder's Handbook and journalist for Bell's Life in London under the pen name "Beacon". Osborne was born in County Meath, Ireland in 1810 and died in Brighton 1901.

He was born into the Osborne family of Dardistown Castle. Educated in Belfast, raised in Ireland he became involved in horse training and racing from an early age.

Osborne moved to London in 1861 to continue his career as a journalist, writing for the sporting and racing paper Bell's Life in London. By this time he was prominent in the horse racing world and considered an authority of the breeding of thoroughbreds.

Osborne's involvement with the Curragh Racecourse resulted in a lodge at the Curragh being named after him.

His first book The Steeple Chase Calendar and Hurdle Race Epitome was published in three volumes for seasons 1848-1851.

Osborne was the owner/trainer of Grand National winner Abd El Kader in 1850 and 1851.
