= Vanguard (steeplechaser) =

British racehorse

- Sire: Belzoni
- Grandsire: Blacklock
- Sex: Gelding
- Foaled: 1835
- Country: United Kingdom
- Colour: Bay
- Owner: George Stanhope, 6th Earl of Chesterfield

Major wins
- Grand National (1843)

Vanguard (foaled 1835) was a steeplechase racehorse. At age eight, he defeated fifteen rivals to win the Grand National at his first attempt. This win gave jockey Tom Olliver his second consecutive victory after winning with Gaylad in 1842. Vanguard became such a favourite of Olliver's that when he died, Olliver ordered that Vanguard's hide be used to make a sofa, which is today in the ownership of Aintree.

== Grand National record ==
Grand National	Position	Jockey	Age	Weight	SP	Distance
1843	1st	Tom Olliver	8	8–10	12/1	Won by 3 lengths. Carried out at fence 15 but continued
