= 1853 Grand National =

English steeplechase horse race

- Grand National
- Location: Aintree
- Date: 2 March 1853
- Winning horse: Peter Simple
- Starting price: 9/1
- Jockey: (England) Tom Olliver
- Trainer: (England) Tom Olliver
- Owner: 'Josey' Little
- Conditions: Soft (heavy in places)

The 1853 Grand National was the 15th renewal of the Grand National horse race that took place at Aintree near Liverpool, England, on 2 March 1853.

== The Course ==
No major changes to the course were noted this year, other than an increase in ploughed land.

First circuit: Start At the field adjacent to the wheat field beyond the lane, Fence 1 {16} Ditch, Fence 2 {17} Low stump hedge and drain, Fence 3 {18} Post and Rails, Fence 4 {19} Old dead hedge with partial ditch on approach, Fence 5 {20} Becher's Brook, Fence 6 {21} Bank, Fence 7 {22} Bank and ditch, Fence 8 {23} Extreme Turn, Fence 9 {24} Valentine's Brook, Fence 10 {25} Hedge, Fence 11 {26} Post and rails, Fence 12 {27} Ditch, Fence 13 {28} Hedge at Canal Bridge. The runners then turned at the first opportunity on re-entering the racecourse and made towards the fences in front of the stands. Fence 14 Bush fence at the distance post, Fence 15 Artificial water jump, 13' 6" wide with a 3' high rail and 4' brook.

Second circuit: The runners then turned away from the Grandstands again and crossed the lane, into the a field known as the wheat piece before following the same circuit until reaching the racecourse again. This time the runners continued to the wider extreme of the course before turning to run up the straight in front of the stands. Fence 29 New hurdles, Fence 30 Long length hurdles, Fence 31 Distance hurdle. The runners then bypassed the Bush Fence and Water Jump on the inside before reaching the winning post in front of the Main Stand. The descriptions of each fence are as they were most recently described by the reporter of the trade paper, Bells Life.

== Leading Contenders ==
Betting on the race was steady until the day before, when most of the competitors were sent out on a prep run, many of them covering two or even three circuits of the course.

Miss Mowbray was made 5/1 favourite on the day despite her trainer, George Dockeray declaring to win with her stable companion, Oscar. Her partner in victory twelves months earlier, Alec Goodman also defected to her stable companion, leaving the ride open, with a rumour circulating around the course the Tom Olliver, the most experienced rider in the history of the race, would take the ride, in turn triggering a flurry of bets. The rumour was only quashed when Olliver emerged in the white silks of his intended mount, Peter Simple and not Mr Mason's light blue, which instead was worn by Frank Gordon, one of a quartet of debut riders, albeit highly respected and experienced. The Champion stayed in mid division with her stable companion through the first circuit before moving forward going to the Artificial water jump. She was lying fourth, with ten lengths to find on the leader turning for home and moved through to challenge approaching the final hurdle. However she was never able to get closer than the four lengths she was beaten by into second place.

Duc An Dhurras 6/1 and nicknamed the Duck and came to Aintree carrying most of the Irish money. He ran an impressive four mile prep the day before the race and was also tipped in the press as the best chance Lord Waterford had ever sent to the race. Johnny Ryan kept the horse in close company with the similar light blue silks of the favourite and her stable companion on the first circuit. However, as both of them took closer order on the second circuit, the Duck was unable to match them and finished a distant eighth, having never got into the business end of the contest.

Oscar was also 6/1 with the confidence of both his trainer, George Dockeray and Miss Mowbray's winning rider, Alec Goodman. The horse was running in the same light blue colours of Mr Mason but was on loan, from the French nobleman, Viscount Artus Talon, who took ownership of the horse after he had won the 1851 Leamington Chase, which led to questions arising over his description and pedigree. Talon ran the horse in modest contests in France and Germany before sending him back to England in Mason's care. The Frenchman and an entourage of friends were in the stands to watch the race. The controversy regarding Oscar hadn't gone away as Sir Peter Laurie's owner, Mr Barnett lodged an objection to the horse's participation. Mr Cartwright followed suit, freely telling the press that his only intention in entering Maurice Daley was to try and secure Oscar's disqualification. How seriously the objections were taken went unrecorded and Alec Gordon gave the horse a steady run on the first circuit before moving forward to just six lengths down on Peter Simple in third turning for home. He came to the final flight upsides the leader and his stable companion, but hit the hurdle and lost momentum he was unable to regain, finishing third, eight lengths down on the winner and four behind his stable companion.

Bourton at 7/1 had been the popular anti post choice for weeks before the race and, not satisfied to put him through two circuits of the course the day before the race, Sam Darling ran three! While some saw that as a measure of his stamina, others noted he didn't take to the plough as well as some of his rivals, also remembering he hadn't lasted home last year. Darling took him to the front at the second fence before dropping back towards the rear along the Cala side, where he took exception to the post and rails and refused, almost taking out The Knight of Gwynne and being stopped from ending up in the Canal itself by the spectators. Darling quickly got him back into the chase, making up the ground by the Artificial water jump. However the effort soon told and Bourton dropped out of contention again before pulling up.

Peter Simple was sent off at 9/1 and had come under the guidance of Tom Olliver as trainer the previous November, being backed in the process as many expected Olliver to also ride him at Aintree, as he'd done when winning the Autumn chase two years earlier. At fifteen years of age, he was considered far too old to repeat his triumph of four years earlier, a belief backed up by his three failures to stay the course in the years since. As in those previous attempts, the horse was prominent from the start, but the increase of plough this year appeared to work in his favour and slow the race enough to suit him. Having led from the post and rails going down to Becher's to the post and rails on the Canal side during the first circuit, Olliver was content to let Abd El Kader take over at a hot pace until overtaking him again at the water. From there, the former winner was never headed in his own bid to join Little Ab as a joint winner of the race. Despite a shortening stride turning for home, he was able to withstand the duel challenge of both Miss Mowbray and Oscar to outlast both on the run in and claim a four length victory.

== The Race ==
With the race scheduled as the fourth on the card, and the lengthy weighing out of the riders, it wasn't until 4:25 in the afternoon that the runners were sent on their way, a time which left visitors from London and the south with the dilemma of either leaving early to catch the last express train home, or face either an overnight train or an overnight stay, neither of which were appealing.

Maurice Daley, Bourton and Peter Simple were all away to a good start, being away almost before the word 'GO' was out of Lord Sefton's mouth. In this order they took the first fence, with Bourton leading over the second and then Peter Simple taking it up at the post and rails. Victress refused here and badly interfered with The General while Betsy Prig, Poll and The Dwarf all fell.

Peter Simple almost ran out going to Becher's for the first time, being kept on a true line by Sir Peter Laurie, who took the brook in front, with Crabbs, Field Marshall, Carrig and Abd El Kader leading the charge. Maurice Daley departed at the Bank where Peter Simple jumped back into the lead before Abd El Kader took up the running at the Extreme turn.

The duel winner increased his advantage to almost forty lengths along the Canal side of the course while behind him Bourton refused and ran out at the Post and rails, almost taking The Knight of Gwynne with him and being prevented from ending up in the Canal itself only by the assistance of mounted spectators along the bank.

Abd El Kader's long lead was reduced by half as he took the Artificial Water jump fifteen lengths to the good over Crabbs and Carrig who in turn were six lengths clear of Peter Simple, Bourton, who had made up a tremendous amount of ground to get back on terms ahead of Oscar, Sir Peter Laurie, Miss Mowbray, View Haloo, Duc An Dhurras and The General. The remainder were tailed off, many rider's silks showing the muddy signs their riders had fallen and remounted.

Just as in last year's race, the wheat field proved difficult to Abd El Kader, who struggled to cross it and was overtaken by Peter Simple, Carrig, Oscar, Crabbs and Miss Mowbray with Sir Peter Laurie and The General the only others able to stay in contention as the leaders made their way over Becher's, the Extreme turn and Valentine's to start their journey into last mile of the race.

Carrig began to struggle after the brooks while second placed Crabbs was also looking spent when he suffered a tired fall at the Post and rails.

Peter Simple maintained a two length lead crossing the lane back onto the racecourse while Abd El Kader had regained his position to sit four lengths clear of Oscar, in turn four lengths clear of stablemate, Miss Mowbray. The remaining runners were widely strung out down the course.

Going towards the three hurdles on the racecourse, both Oscar and Miss Mowbray moved closer to challenge the leader as Abd El Kader weakened and by the final hurdle the two stable companions were upsides the long time leader. Oscar hit the hurdle, losing vital momentum that he couldn't regain as the race developed into a battle of which former winner was about to become a dual champion.

Peter Simple was the one going better and began drawing away from Miss Mowbray to win by four lengths with Oscar a further four lengths down in third. Sir Peter Laurie was a distance behind the first three when he got up to beat Abd El Kader while The General came home sixth with Carrig walking in seventh, Duc An Dhurras eighth and Tipperary Boy the last to complete.

== Finishing Order ==
| Position | Name | Jockey | Handicap (st-lb) | SP | Distance | Colours |
|---|---|---|---|---|---|---|
| Winner | Peter Simple | Tom Olliver | 10-10 | 9-1 | 10 mins 37.5 secs | White, black sleeves and cap |
| Second | Miss Mowbray | Frank Gordon | 10-12 | 5-1 | 4 lengths | Light blue, white cap |
| Third | Oscar | Alec Goodman | 10-2 | 6-1 | 4 lengths | Light blue, white cap |
| Fourth | Sir Peter Laurie | Bill Holman | 11-8 | 12-1 | A distance | Black, white sleeves and cap |
| Fifth | Abd El Kader | Tom Abbott | 10-10 | 20-1 | | Yellow, black cap |
| Sixth | The General | T. Ablett | 10-4 | 25-1 | | Blue, yellow sleeves, black cap |
| Seventh | Carrig | Denny Wynne | 10-5 | 15-1 | Walked in | Blue, black cap |
| Eighth | Duc An Dhurras | John Ryan | 10-10 | 6-1 | | Light blue, black cap |
| Ninth and last | Tipperary Boy | John Butler | 10-10 | 25-1 | | Cerise and grey hoops, white sleeves |
| Fence 26 {Post and rails} | Crabbs | W. Fowler | 9-2 | 25-1 | Fell | White, yellow sleeves and cap |
| Fence 21 {Bank} | View Halloo | William Archer | 9-10 | 100-6 | Pulled Up before fence 24 | White, red sleeves, black cap, gold tassle |
| Fence 16 {Ditch] | The Knight of Gwynne | Tom Donaldson | 11-2 | 25-1 | Broke Down & Pulled Up | Red, blue cap |
| Fence 16 {Ditch} | Bourton | Sam Darling Jnr | 11-2 | 7-1 | Refused fence 11, 1st circuit regained position by fence 15, Tailed off and Pulled up after this. | |
| Fence 16 {Ditch} | Clatterbox | T. Gaman | 9-8 | 25-1 | Tailed off and pulled up | Pink, black sleeves and cap |
| Fence 16 {Ditch} | Field Marshal | R. Nelson | 10-4 | 25-1 | Fell, fence 11, remounted, Tailed off and Pulled Up | Black, white cap |
| Fence 16 {Ditch} | Maley | E. Harrison | 9-10 | 25-1 | Fell 3rd fence, remounted, Pulled up | White, red cap |
| Fence 16 {Ditch} | The Dwarf | Harry Lamplugh | 9-0 | 25-1 | Fell 3rd, remounted, Pulled up | Orange, white sleeves |
| Fence 6 {Bank} | Maurice Daley {Formerly Flycatcher} | Charles Boyce | 10-2 | 25-1 | Fell | Scarlet, black cap |
| Fence 5 Becher's Brook | Victress | John Tasker | 10-6 | 12/1 | Refused 3rd fence, went on, Pulled Up | Scarlet, black cap |
| Fence 3 {Post and Rails} | Betsy Prig | Dan Meaney | 10-0 | 25-1 | Fell | Yellow, blue sash |
| Fence 3 {Post and Rails} | Poll | Jack Debeau | 9-10 | 25-1 | Fell | Blue, Orange sleeves and navy quartered cap |

Non runners Vainhope, Lucy Neale, Montague, Augustine, Half-and-Half, Leporello, Remark, Kilquade, Ringleader, Friendless, Ringdove

== Aftermath ==
Captain Little, the owner of Peter Simple later revealed that Olliver had told him before the race "Sometimes he means it and I don't, sometimes I means it and he don't but today we both mean it."

Peter Simple went to Doncaster the following week, completing the Grand National double and again relegating Miss Mowbray into runner's up spot
