= Dick Christian =

Richard Christian (1779–1862) was an English horseman.

== Biography ==
Christian was the son of James and Jane Christian (née Lester) of Cottesmore, Rutland. He was taken on as a groom by Sir Gilbert Heathcote and was subsequently employed by the Cottesmore Hunt, of which Sir Gilbert was Master. In 1809 he set up as a farmer in North Luffenham and in the 1820s he moved to Melton Mowbray, the centre of the English hunting world. Between 1841 and 1856 he was employed by Lord Scarbrough. He died in penury on 5 June 1862.

== Career ==
George Underhill recorded (albeit inaccurately in relation to Christian's alleged illiteracy) that:

It was Dick Christian’s profession to earn his living out of the hunting field. He rode in many steeple chases but was never a cross-country jockey as we understand the phrase. He bought and sold many horses, but was never a professional dealer. He was paid for giving opinions upon the merits or demerits of many horses, but he was never a veterinary surgeon. He was “hail fellow well met” with everybody from George IV to an earthstopper, and could hardly write his own name.

Among the famous races in which Dick Christian took part was the 1826 steeplechase between Horatio Ross’s horse Clinker and George Osbaldeston’s Clasher. Christian rode Clinker and was narrowly defeated by Osbaldeston on Clasher.

William Blew's history of the Quorn Hunt recorded that:

Dick Christian's forte was making hunters. From all accounts he was not a first-class steeplechase rider; but up to a certain point in his life he had a wonderfully good nerve, and he was constantly put on rough horses with orders to turn aside from nothing, and he certainly carried out his directions. He jumped over a whole flock of sheep, and rode the mare Marigold over a most extraordinary drop fence, Marigold being a mare which had given a succession of breakers no little trouble.

Christian also took part in the first ever running of the Grand Liverpool Steeplechase at Aintree, later renamed the Grand National. Up until the time of his death this was still considered to have been the first official running of the race. Christian also played a prominent, if comical role in the famous set of prints of the Quorn Hunt made by Rudolph Ackermann in 1835:

"Who is that under his horse in the brook?" enquires that good sportsman & fine rider, Mr Green of Rolleston, whose noted old mare had just skimmed over the water like a swallow on a summer's evening. "Only Dick Christian," answers Lord Forester, "& it is nothing new to him." "But he'll be drowned", exclaims Lord Kinnaird. "I shouldn't wonder", observes Mr Coke. But the pace is too good to enquire.

Christian also featured in The Druid's Post and Paddock and Silk and Scarlet. In the former book, "Dick Christian's Lecture" is a vivid account of horsemanship and foxhunting in Leicestershire in the early 19th century, while the latter starts with "Dick Christian Again", an early example of a writer willing to risk life and limb for a good story.
