= Bartholomew Bretherton (jockey) =

British jockey

Bartholomew Bretherton (1812–1866) was a jockey from Maghull, north of Liverpool who rode many times in the Grand National as an amateur rider, winning the race in 1840 in the colours of Henry Villebois on his horse Jerry.

== Biography ==
Bretherton's father was Francis Bretherton (c. 1770 – 1833), coach proprietor of Maghull. Bretherton was his eighth child and third son. Bretherton's father and older brother Peter (second child and first son of Francis) were credited with starting horse-racing at Maghull Meadows, the precursor of Aintree Racecourse, in the late 1820s and 1830s. On 29 February 1836 a handicap race called the Grand Liverpool Steeplechase, was held at Aintree Racecourse which was the first of three unofficial precursors of the race which would become known as The Grand National. Bretherton took part in this race, coming third on a horse named Cockahoop. During the race the rider Horatio Powell, riding the favourite, Laurie Todd, fell from his horse and it was alleged that Bretherton deliberately steered his horse towards him in order to prevent him remounting. Powell was knocked back to the ground and forced to retire from the race through injury. He did not, however, lodge any protest on his return to the weighing room, suggesting that the act was considered part of the game. The winner of this race was The Duke, ridden by Captain Martin Becher (he later gave his name to the fence named Becher's Brook, when he fell there from his mount, Conrad, in the first official Grand National in 1839, and took shelter in the brook to avoid injury).

In 1838, Bretherton managed to prevent a coach from being overturned on the Preston road by climbing out of the window of the coach and taking charge of the reins and the horses by riding on their backs. On Monday 19 February 1838, when the Warrington Mail was en route from Preston to Chorley, the wheel of the coach went into a deep rut in the road, came into contact with a piece of ice, and threw the coachman off the box into the road. There were no passengers outside and only two inside, one of whom was Bartholomew Bretherton. As the horses increased their speed, Bretherton opened the door, climbed out onto the roof of the coach and over the box seat down upon the pole. While the horses were "going at a tremendous rate", and with considerable risk to his life, Bretherton succeeded in getting hold of the reins which were dangling amongst the horses' feet and was able eventually to pull them up just soon enough to prevent the coach running into two carts which were in the road.

A newspaper article in 1851 describes a pair of jockey top boots which were made for him in Liverpool and weighed only five ounces.

The family was based in southwest Lancashire and Bretherton was a bachelor. Before his death he lived with his sisters in Lydiate, near Maghull, for a number of years which is where he died in 1866. His younger brother Francis was his executor. His uncle, and namesake, Bartholomew Bretherton, was a coach proprietor and landowner in Rainhill. He owned Rainhill House, which became Loyola Hall and founded St Bartholomew's Church, Rainhill.

== See also ==
- Evelyn, Princess Blücher
