= Charity (horse) =

British racehorse

Charity was a racehorse who won the 1841 Grand National at her second attempt, defeating ten rivals in a time of 13 minutes 25 seconds. William Vevers was the official trainer of Charity. The owner of the horse was William Craven, 2nd Earl of Craven. She was the first mare to win the race, defeating the second-place finisher, Cigar, by a length.

Charity had previously taken part in the 1839 Grand National, falling at the wall, which was sited roughly where the water jump is situated on the modern course. The mare was remounted by her rider A Powell only to fall again before reaching the Becher's Brook for the second time.
