= Horatio Powell =

English jockey

Horatio Nelson Powell
Personal information
- Born: 1806 Gloucestershire, England
- Died: 29 November 1869 (aged 62–63) Echuca, Victoria, Australia

Horse racing career
- Sport: Horse racing

Major racing wins
- Grand National (1841)

Significant horses
- Charity

Horatio Nelson Powell (1806–1869) was an English jockey who won the 1841 Grand National on Charity.
Powell rode in 10 Grand Nationals between 1839 and 1849.
He moved to Australia, where he was admitted as a solicitor by the Supreme Court of Victoria in July 1861.

Powell died on 29 November 1869 in Echuca, Victoria, in Australia, following a buggy accident.
