= Jerry (Grand National winner) =

British racehorse

Jerry was a British racehorse. He won the 1840 Grand National, defeating twelve rivals. He was ridden by Bartholomew Bretherton, trained by George Dockeray and owned by Henry Villebois.
