= Allen McDonough =

Irish jockey

Personal information
- Born: 1804 Wellmont, County Galway, Ireland
- Died: 12 May 1888 (aged 83–84) Dublin

Horse racing career
- Sport: Horse racing

Major racing wins
- Grand National 1838; Dunchurch Chase, 1841; Warwick Chase, 1841; Worcester Grand Annual, 1842, 1846

Significant horses
- Sir William; The Nun; Cigar; Roderick Random; Brunette

Allen McDonough (1804–1888) was an Irish jockey who won the Grand National in 1838 on Sir William.

He died in Dublin on 12 May 1888 aged 84.
