= Lottery (Grand National winner) =

British-bred Thoroughbred racehorse

Lottery was the winner of the 1839 Grand National steeplechase at Aintree, near Liverpool, England. This was recorded by the press of the time as the fourth running, but the previous three races, run at Maghull, failed to capture the imagination and were quickly forgotten.

One Victorian commentator claimed that Lottery could trot faster than most of his rivals could gallop, and it was widely believed that he would have won the National more than once had it not been for a heavy weight burden imposed in 1841 and 1842 that left him little chance of victory. However, he also failed to win the 1840 Grand National when, without the weight burden, he fell at the wall. Some courses were so concerned that Lottery would scare away the opposition that they framed the conditions of races, as late as 1842, to stipulate that they were open to any horse bar the winner of the 1840 Cheltenham Steeplechase, said horse being Lottery.

Lottery was retired to a stable at East Langton in Leicestershire where he lived for many years. On his death, he was buried in an adjacent field with an engraved stone marking his resting place.

== See also ==
- List of racehorses
