= Jem Mason =

English jockey

James "Jem" Mason (c. 1816 – 1866) was a champion English jockey. On 26 February 1839 he won the Grand National in Liverpool on a brown-bay racehorse called Lottery.

Born in Stilton, Cambridgeshire to a horse-dealing family he started riding professionally in 1834, winning at St Albans that year. He was known for his exquisite style of dress and for socialising with the peerage and continued riding through to 1848 though he was never able to repeat his early successes.

Harriet Howard (1823–1865) moved in with Mason when she was fifteen years old. Later she became the mistress of Napoleon III. Mason married twice: the first time in 1840 to Charlotte Mary Zoe Elmore, the daughter of the horse dealer John Elmore in whose blue colours and black cap Mason had won the National, but it ended in divorce. He died of throat cancer in 1866.
