= Devine =

Devine is an Irish surname derived from Ní Dhaimhín / Ó Daimhín. Notable people with the surname include:

- Adam DeVine (born 1983), American actor, comedian, singer, writer and producer
- Alan Devine (born 1970), Irish actor
- Alexander Devine, British educator and advocate for Montenegrin independence
- Andy Devine (1905–1977), American character actor
- Andy Devine (English actor) (1942–2022), mainly on British television
- Annie Bell Robinson Devine (1912–2000), American civil rights activist
- Archibald Devine (1887–1964), Scottish footballer
- Aubrey Devine, American football player
- Betsy Devine (born 1946), American writer
- Bing Devine (1916–2007), American baseball executive
- Bonnie Devine (born 1952), Indigenous Canadian artist
- Candi Devine (born 1959), ring name of Candace Maria Rummel, American wrestler
- Candy Devine, Australian broadcaster, singer and actress
- Christine Devine, American news anchor
- Dan Devine (1924–2002), American football player and coach
- Danny Devine (footballer, born 1992), Irish footballer
- David Devine (athlete) (born 1992), British Paralympic athlete
- David Devine (director), Canadian film director and producer
- Edward Thomas Devine (1867–1948), American professor of economics and social welfare advocate
- Elizabeth Devine (writer) (born 1961), American scriptwriter and producer
- Fiona Devine, British sociologist
- Frank Devine, Australian journalist and editor
- George Devine (1910–1966), English theatre producer, manager and actor
- Graeme Devine, Scottish computer game designer and programmer
- Graham Anthony Devine, British classical guitarist
- Grant Devine, Canadian politician, Saskatchewan premier
- Henry Devine (1879–1940), English psychiatrist
- Jack Devine, American intelligence operative
- Jack Devine (ice hockey), Canadian ice hockey administrator and radio personality
- Jack Devine (ice hockey, born 2003), American ice hockey player
- Jim Devine, British politician, MP for Livingston 2005–2010
- Joey Devine (born 1983), American baseball player
- John Devine (disambiguation), several people
- Johnny Devine (born 1974), Canadian wrestler
- Joseph Devine (1937–2019), Scottish Roman Catholic bishop
- Joseph M. Devine (1861–1938), North Dakota governor, 1898–99
- Karen Devine, American computer scientist
- Kevin Devine, American songwriter and musician
- Len Devine, Australian politician
- Loretta Devine, African-American stage and screen actress
- Magenta Devine (1957–2019), British television presenter and journalist
- Máire Devine, Irish senator
- Matthew Devine (born 2002), Irish Rugby Union player
- Michael Devine (disambiguation), several people
- Miranda Devine, Australian journalist
- Noel Devine (born 1988), American football player
- Pat Devine, British economist
- Patricia G. Devine, American psychologist
- Peter Devine (footballer) (born 1960), English footballer
- Peter Devine (fencer) (born 1976), American fencer
- Rachel Devine (1875–1960), Scottish jute weaver and trade unionist
- Richard Devine, American electronic musician
- Robert Devine (Touch Rugby Coach), International Touch Coach
- Samuel L. Devine (1915–1997), American politician
- Steve Devine, New Zealand rugby player
- Sydney Devine, Scottish singer
- Tameika Isaac Devine, American politician
- Tilly Devine, Australian criminal
- Tom Devine, Scottish historian
- Winsford Devine, Trinidad and Tobago songwriter

== See also ==
- Divine (disambiguation)
