= Heisman curse =

Superstition in American football

The Heisman curse is a two-part assertion of a negative future for the winner of the Heisman Trophy in American football. The "curse" supposes that any college football player who wins the Heisman plays on a team that will likely lose its subsequent bowl game. The trend of post-award failure has garnered the attention of the mainstream media.

== History ==
Talk of a Heisman curse in relation to bowl results was particularly prevalent from 2003 to 2008, when six Heisman Trophy winners compiled a cumulative 1–5 bowl game record, and five of those six led number one ranked teams into the Bowl Championship Series (BCS) National Championship Game as favorites (Heisman Trophy winners, including Reggie Bush, who gave back his Heisman Trophy, are 4–8 overall in the BCS National Championship Game and College Football Playoff National Championship, although prior to 2009 they were 1–6). Additionally, the Heisman curse asserts that most Heisman winners will either have a poor career in the National Football League (NFL), or not even see such a football career at all. Although many Heisman winners have not enjoyed success at the professional level, including Matt Leinart, Andre Ware, Jason White, Rashaan Salaam, Eric Crouch, Ty Detmer, Troy Smith and Gino Torretta, proponents of the "curse" rarely cite highly successful players such as Barry Sanders, Charles Woodson, Eddie George, Tim Brown, Bo Jackson, Marcus Allen, Earl Campbell, O. J. Simpson, and Tony Dorsett among the notables.

Insofar as there is a "curse" of underperforming Heisman winners, it seems to affect quarterbacks disproportionately. Although certain Heisman winners have gone on to win Super Bowl championships (such as Roger Staubach and Jim Plunkett), comparatively few have had successful NFL careers. Conversely, running backs seem generally to have fared better in the professional ranks, and wide receivers have had mixed results. The only primarily defensive Heisman winner, Charles Woodson, had a successful NFL career and final collegiate bowl game appearance. Seven Heisman winners have also been named Associated Press NFL MVP: Paul Hornung, Simpson, Campbell, Allen, Sanders, Cam Newton, and Lamar Jackson. Meanwhile, four have won the Super Bowl Most Valuable Player Award: Staubach, Plunkett, Allen, and Desmond Howard.

The "curse" does not imply that only Heisman winners have failed careers, only the irony behind college football's best underperforming after the award is given. However, while there are numerous counts of players who underperformed after winning the award, an equal number of players have gone on to see great success, evidence that the "curse" is more of an amusement than a reality.

While there is no statistical or empirical evidence that suggests Heisman winners underperform compared to other high-profile collegiate players, some try to explain the perception of the curse by reference to trends regarding voter selections. Some see the trend going back decades to other players, but it has most famously been observed since the 1990s. The accepted logical explanation for the discrepancy between success and failure of Heisman winners is that the people who pick the Heisman are sportswriters and former Heisman winners. This might mean that they vote for a winner based on reputation, without seeing him or really studying him, basically a qualitative approach. On the other hand, the people who pick players for the NFL are talent evaluators. They study footage, interview players and put them through workouts where their strengths and weaknesses can be quantified.

== Heisman Trophy winner's bowl game results ==
Year	Player	Team	Bowl game	Opponent	Bowl game result
1935	Jay Berwanger	Chicago Maroons	No bowl	—	—
1936	Larry Kelley	No. 12 Yale Bulldogs	No bowl	—	—
1937	Clint Frank	No. 12 Yale Bulldogs	No bowl	—	—
1938	Davey O'Brien	No. 1 TCU Horned Frogs	1939 Sugar Bowl	No. 6 Carnegie Tech	W, 15–7
1939	Nile Kinnick	No. 9 Iowa Hawkeyes	No bowl	—	—
1940	Tom Harmon	No. 3 Michigan Wolverines	No bowl	—	—
1941	Bruce Smith	No. 1 Minnesota Golden Gophers	No bowl	—	—
1942	Frank Sinkwich	No. 2 Georgia Bulldogs	1943 Rose Bowl	No. 13 UCLA Bruins	W, 9–0
1943	Angelo Bertelli	No. 1 Notre Dame Fighting Irish	No bowl	—	—
1944	Les Horvath	No. 2 Ohio State Buckeyes	No bowl	—	—
1945	Doc Blanchard	No. 1 Army Cadets	No bowl	—	—
1946	Glenn Davis	No. 2 Army Cadets	No bowl	—	—
1947	Johnny Lujack	No. 1 Notre Dame Fighting Irish	No bowl	—	—
1948	Doak Walker	No. 10 SMU Mustangs	1949 Cotton Bowl Classic	No. 9 Oregon Ducks	W, 21–13
1949	Leon Hart	No. 1 Notre Dame Fighting Irish	No bowl	—	—
1950	Vic Janowicz	No. 14 Ohio State Buckeyes	No bowl	—	—
1951	Dick Kazmaier	No. 6 Princeton Tigers	No bowl	—	—
1952	Billy Vessels	No. 4 Oklahoma Sooners	No bowl	—	—
1953	Johnny Lattner	No. 2 Notre Dame Fighting Irish	No bowl	—	—
1954	Alan Ameche	No. 9 Wisconsin Badgers	No bowl	—	—
1955	Howard Cassady	No. 5 Ohio State Buckeyes	No bowl	—	—
1956	Paul Hornung	Notre Dame Fighting Irish	No bowl	—	—
1957	John David Crow	No. 9 Texas A&M Aggies	1957 Gator Bowl	No. 13 Tennessee Volunteers	L, 0–3
1958	Pete Dawkins	No. 3 Army Cadets	No bowl	—	—
1959	Billy Cannon	No. 3 LSU Tigers	1960 Sugar Bowl	No. 2 Ole Miss Rebels	L, 0–21
1960	Joe Bellino	No. 4 Navy Midshipmen	1961 Orange Bowl	No. 5 Missouri Tigers	L, 14–21
1961	Ernie Davis	No. 14 Syracuse Orangemen	1961 Liberty Bowl	Miami Hurricanes	W, 15–14
1962	Terry Baker	Oregon State	1962 Liberty Bowl	Villanova Wildcats	W, 6–0
1963	Roger Staubach	No. 2 Navy Midshipmen	1964 Cotton Bowl Classic	No. 1 Texas Longhorns	L, 6–28
1964	John Huarte	No. 3 Notre Dame Fighting Irish	No bowl	—	—
1965	Mike Garrett	No. 10 USC Trojans	No bowl	—	—
1966	Steve Spurrier	No. 11 Florida Gators	1967 Orange Bowl	No. 8 Georgia Tech Yellow Jackets	W, 27–12
1967	Gary Beban	UCLA Bruins	No bowl	—	—
1968	O. J. Simpson	No. 2 USC Trojans	1969 Rose Bowl	No. 1 Ohio State Buckeyes	L, 16–27
1969	Steve Owens	Oklahoma Sooners	No bowl	—	—
1970	Jim Plunkett	No. 12 Stanford Indians	1971 Rose Bowl	No. 2 Ohio State Buckeyes	W, 27–17
1971	Pat Sullivan	No. 5 Auburn Tigers	1972 Sugar Bowl	No. 3 Oklahoma Sooners	L, 22–40
1972	Johnny Rodgers	No. 9 Nebraska Cornhuskers	1973 Orange Bowl	No. 12 Notre Dame Fighting Irish	W, 40–6
1973	John Cappelletti	No. 6 Penn State Nittany Lions	1974 Orange Bowl	No. 13 LSU Tigers	W, 16–9
1974	Archie Griffin	No. 3 Ohio State Buckeyes	1975 Rose Bowl	No. 5 USC Trojans	L, 17–18
1975	Archie Griffin	No. 1 Ohio State Buckeyes	1976 Rose Bowl	No. 11 UCLA Bruins	L, 10–23
1976	Tony Dorsett	No. 1 Pittsburgh Panthers	1977 Sugar Bowl	No. 5 Georgia Bulldogs	W, 27–3
1977	Earl Campbell	No. 1 Texas Longhorns	1978 Cotton Bowl Classic	No. 5 Notre Dame Fighting Irish	L, 10–38
1978	Billy Sims	No. 4 Oklahoma Sooners	1979 Orange Bowl	No. 6 Nebraska Cornhuskers	W, 31–24
1979	Charles White	No. 3 USC Trojans	1980 Rose Bowl	No. 1 Ohio State Buckeyes	W, 17–16
1980	George Rogers	No. 18 South Carolina Gamecocks	1980 Gator Bowl	No. 3 Pittsburgh Panthers	L, 9–37
1981	Marcus Allen	No. 8 USC Trojans	1982 Fiesta Bowl	No. 7 Penn State Nittany Lions	L, 10–26
1982	Herschel Walker	No. 1 Georgia Bulldogs	1983 Sugar Bowl	No. 2 Penn State Nittany Lions	L, 23–27
1983	Mike Rozier	No. 1 Nebraska Cornhuskers	1984 Orange Bowl	No. 5 Miami Hurricanes	L, 30–31
1984	Doug Flutie	No. 8 Boston College Eagles	1985 Cotton Bowl Classic	Houston Cougars	W, 45–28
1985	Bo Jackson	No. 16 Auburn Tigers	1986 Cotton Bowl Classic	No. 11 Texas A&M Aggies	L, 16–36
1986	Vinny Testaverde	No. 1 Miami Hurricanes	1987 Fiesta Bowl	No. 2 Penn State Nittany Lions	L, 10–14
1987	Tim Brown	No. 12 Notre Dame Fighting Irish	1988 Cotton Bowl Classic	No. 13 Texas A&M Aggies	L, 10–35
1988	Barry Sanders	No. 12 Oklahoma State	1988 Holiday Bowl	No. 15 Wyoming Cowboys	W, 62–14
1989	Andre Ware	No. 13 Houston Cougars	No bowl (NCAA probation)	—	—
1990	Ty Detmer	No. 13 BYU Cougars	1990 Holiday Bowl	Texas A&M Aggies	L, 14–65
1991	Desmond Howard	No. 4 Michigan Wolverines	1992 Rose Bowl	No. 2 Washington Huskies	L, 14–34
1992	Gino Torretta	No. 1 Miami Hurricanes	1993 Sugar Bowl (National Championship Game)	No. 2 Alabama Crimson Tide	L, 13–34
1993	Charlie Ward	No. 1 Florida State Seminoles	1994 Orange Bowl (National Championship Game)	No. 2 Nebraska Cornhuskers	W, 18–16
1994	Rashaan Salaam	No. 4 Colorado Buffaloes	1995 Fiesta Bowl	Notre Dame Fighting Irish	W, 41–24
1995	Eddie George	No. 4 Ohio State Buckeyes	1996 Florida Citrus Bowl	No. 5 Tennessee Volunteers	L, 14–20
1996	Danny Wuerffel	No. 3 Florida Gators	1997 Sugar Bowl (National Championship Game)	No. 1 Florida State Seminoles	W, 52–20
1997	Charles Woodson	No. 1 Michigan Wolverines	1998 Rose Bowl	No. 8 Washington State Cougars	W, 21–16
1998	Ricky Williams	No. 20 Texas Longhorns	1999 Cotton Bowl Classic	No. 25 Mississippi State Bulldogs	W, 38–11
1999	Ron Dayne	No. 4 Wisconsin Badgers	2000 Rose Bowl	No. 22 Stanford Cardinal	W, 17–9
2000	Chris Weinke	No. 2 Florida State Seminoles	2001 Orange Bowl (National Championship Game)	No. 1 Oklahoma Sooners	L, 2–13
2001	Eric Crouch	No. 2 Nebraska Cornhuskers	2002 Rose Bowl (National Championship Game)	No. 1 Miami Hurricanes	L, 14–37
2002	Carson Palmer	No. 5 USC Trojans	2003 Orange Bowl	No. 3 Iowa Hawkeyes	W, 38–17
2003	Jason White	No. 1 Oklahoma Sooners	2004 Sugar Bowl (National Championship Game)	No. 2 LSU Tigers	L, 14–21
2004	Matt Leinart	No. 1 USC Trojans	2005 Orange Bowl (National Championship Game)	No. 2 Oklahoma Sooners	W^{‡}, 55–19
2005	Reggie Bush	No. 1 USC Trojans	2006 Rose Bowl (National Championship Game)	No. 2 Texas Longhorns	L, 38–41
2006	Troy Smith	No. 1 Ohio State Buckeyes	2007 BCS National Championship Game	No. 2 Florida Gators	L, 14–41
2007	Tim Tebow	No. 9 Florida Gators	2008 Capital One Bowl	Michigan Wolverines	L, 35–41
2008	Sam Bradford	No. 1 Oklahoma Sooners	2009 BCS National Championship Game	No. 2 Florida Gators	L, 14–24
2009	Mark Ingram II	No. 1 Alabama Crimson Tide	2010 BCS National Championship Game	No. 2 Texas Longhorns	W, 37–21
2010	Cam Newton	No. 1 Auburn Tigers	2011 BCS National Championship Game	No. 2 Oregon Ducks	W, 22–19
2011	Robert Griffin III	No. 12 Baylor Bears	2011 Alamo Bowl	Washington Huskies	W, 67–56
2012	Johnny Manziel	No. 10 Texas A&M Aggies	2013 Cotton Bowl Classic	No. 12 Oklahoma Sooners	W, 41–13
2013	Jameis Winston	No. 1 Florida State Seminoles	2014 BCS National Championship Game	No. 2 Auburn Tigers	W, 34–31
2014	Marcus Mariota	No. 3 Oregon Ducks	2015 Rose Bowl; 2015 College Football Playoff National Championship	No. 2 Florida State Seminoles; No. 4 Ohio State Buckeyes	W, 59–20; L, 20–42
2015	Derrick Henry	No. 2 Alabama Crimson Tide	2015 Cotton Bowl Classic (December); 2016 College Football Playoff National Championship	No. 3 Michigan State Spartans; No. 1 Clemson Tigers	W, 38–0; W, 45–40
2016	Lamar Jackson	No. 8 Louisville Cardinals	2016 Citrus Bowl (December)	No. 13 LSU Tigers	L, 9–29
2017	Baker Mayfield	No. 2 Oklahoma Sooners	2018 Rose Bowl	No. 3 Georgia Bulldogs	L, 48–54
2018	Kyler Murray	No. 4 Oklahoma Sooners	2018 Orange Bowl	No. 1 Alabama Crimson Tide	L, 34–45
2019	Joe Burrow	No. 1 LSU Tigers	2019 Peach Bowl; 2020 College Football Playoff National Championship	No. 4 Oklahoma Sooners; No. 3 Clemson Tigers	W, 63–28; W, 42–25
2020	DeVonta Smith	No. 1 Alabama Crimson Tide	2021 Rose Bowl 2021 College Football Playoff National Championship	No. 4 Notre Dame Fighting Irish No. 3 Ohio State Buckeyes	W, 31–14; W, 52–24
2021	Bryce Young	No. 1 Alabama Crimson Tide	2021 Cotton Bowl Classic; 2022 College Football Playoff National Championship	No. 4 Cincinnati Bearcats; No. 3 Georgia Bulldogs	W, 27–6; L, 18–33
2022	Caleb Williams	No. 10 USC Trojans	2023 Cotton Bowl Classic (January)	No. 16 Tulane Green Wave	L, 45–46
2023	Jayden Daniels	No. 13 LSU Tigers	2024 ReliaQuest Bowl (January)	Wisconsin Badgers	W, 35–31
2024	Travis Hunter	No. 23 Colorado Buffaloes	2024 Alamo Bowl (December)	No. 17 BYU Cougars	L, 14-36
2025	Fernando Mendoza	No. 1 Indiana Hoosiers	2026 Rose Bowl; 2026 Peach Bowl; 2026 College Football Playoff National Championship	No. 9 Alabama Crimson Tide; No. 5 Oregon Ducks; No. 10 Miami Hurricanes	W, 38-3; W, 56-22; W, 27-21

Rankings are from the AP Poll upon entering bowl games
^{‡} USC's 2005 Orange Bowl win was later vacated.
