= 1836 in sports =

1836 in sports describes the year's events in world sport.

== Boxing ==
Events

- James Burke decides to try his luck in America and so the English Championship issue lies unresolved for another three years.

== Cricket ==
Events

- 17 June — a meeting in Brighton establishes a "Sussex Cricket Fund" to support county matches and it is from this organisation that Sussex County Cricket Club is formally constituted in 1839
- 11–12 July — the inaugural North v South fixture is held at Lord's between teams representing the North and South of England. The North wins by 6 wickets.

England

- Most runs – Alfred Mynn 407 @ 33.91 (HS 125*)
- Most wickets – William Lillywhite 51 (BB 9–?)

== Horse racing ==
Events

- The inaugural running of the Great Liverpool Steeplechase takes place at Aintree Racecourse. Three years later, it will become the Grand National. The first winner is The Duke ridden by Captain Martin Becher, after whom Becher's Brook will be named.

England

- Grand National – The Duke
- 1,000 Guineas Stakes – Destiny
- 2,000 Guineas Stakes – Bay Middleton
- The Derby – Bay Middleton
- The Oaks – Cyprian
- St. Leger Stakes – Elis

== Rowing ==
The Boat Race

- 17 June — the Oxford and Cambridge Boat Race, first held in 1829, is revived and the 2nd race takes place on the Thames between Westminster and Putney. Cambridge records its first win in the event.
