= 1837 in sports =

1837 in sports describes the year's events in world sport.

== Boxing ==
Events

- With James Burke now operating in America, attention shifts to the upcoming Ben Caunt and William "Bendigo" Thompson who each win two fights in 1837, but there remains no resolution to the English title issue.

== Cricket ==
Events

- Kent is the most successful team and this marks the beginning of a great period in the county's history till1849. Mainstays of the Kent team in these years include Alfred Mynn, Fuller Pilch, Nicholas Felix, Ned Wenman and William Hillyer.

England

- Most runs – Fuller Pilch 372 @ 26.57 (HS 84)
- Most wickets – William Lillywhite 99 @ 8.65 (BB 10–?)

== Horse racing ==
England

- Grand National – The Duke
- 1,000 Guineas Stakes – Chapeau d'Espagne
- 2,000 Guineas Stakes – Achmet
- The Derby – Phosphorus
- The Oaks – Miss Letty
- St. Leger Stakes – Mango

== Rowing ==
The Boat Race

- The Oxford and Cambridge Boat Race is not held this year
