= 1838 Grand Liverpool Steeplechase =

- Grand Liverpool Steeplechase
- Location: Aintree
- Date: 5 March 1838
- Winning horse: Sir William
- Starting price: 2/1
- Jockey: Allen McDonough

The 1838 Grand Liverpool Steeplechase was the last of three unofficial annual precursors of a Handicap Steeple-chase, later to become known as the Grand National Steeplechase horse race which took place at Aintree Racecourse near Liverpool on Monday 5 March 1838 and attracted a field of only three runners. This race did not carry the prestige of the future Grand Nationals and its status as an official Grand National was revoked sometime between 1862 and 1873.

== Competitors and betting ==
Three competitors faced the starter and were quoted as follows.

- 1/2 Favourite, The Duke the winner of the 1836 & 1837 runnings, ridden by his partner from the first of those victories, Captain Martin Becher
- 2/1 Sir William, ridden by Allen McDonough
- 3/1 Scamp, also a debut ride for Mr Clarendon

== The race ==
Scamp led the trio to the Sunken Lane, which was the first obstacle. All three jumped the first element, into the lane, but only The Duke successfully navigated the second element, back out of the lane. Scamp bolted down the lane while Sir William refused. This allowed The Duke to build a substantial lead over the course of a circuit and a half of the race. However, his stride began to shorten as he approached the racecourse proper for the final time and Sir William, who had been ridden at a much more measured pace on testing ground, began closing the gap. He came upsides The Duke at the penultimate flight before leaving him behind to win easily by 15 lengths. The Duke was exhausted by the time he reached the final flight of hurdles, barley getting over the obstacle. Scamp came upsides and once past The Duke the latter gave up the chase and was walked to the finish. Sir William completed the course in a time of fifteen minutes, over a minute slower than the previous year's renewal.

== Aftermath ==
The race had been delayed due to the weather and the resulting clash with the much more prestigious St Albans chase saw a field of competitors that failed to capture the imagination of the public. The waning finances of the race organiser, William Lynn resulted in a committee being formed to try to boost the race. Before the next renewal they ensured it wouldn't clash with any other events in the calendar, moved the start beyond the sunken lane, which had caused issues in both the previous renewals, increased both the prize money and the quality of the fences but, most importantly, would benefit from the arrival of the railway next to the track, which would make it easier for competitors from farther afield to enter the race.

For many years after this event the race was regarded as the third running of the Grand National by racegoers and pressmen alike, however this stance began to change during the 1860s when national newspapers began listing the former winners of the National back only as far as 1839. When the official honours board at Aintree was erected in 1894 it stated that the race of 1838 was run at a nearby course in Maghull and that the winner was a horse named Sir Henry, ridden by Mr Olliver against nine rivals.

Racing returns from this period show that racing at Maghull ceased in 1835 and that there was no horse in training in 1838 named Sir Henry. The only jockey named Olliver in racing at the time was Tom Olliver and on the date of the race he was riding at St Albans.

For over a century the detail recorded on the honours board was accepted as fact until evidence was presented to show the real events of the 1838 Great Liverpool chase. While it is now accepted among the majority of racing writers that the 1838 race was indeed run at Aintree and not Maghull it is still the official view that the lack of prestige in the race prior to 1839 warrants its continued omission from being declared an official Grand National.

== Finishing order ==
Position	Horse	Jockey	Age	Weight	Starting Price	Distance or Fate	Colours
01	Sir William	Allen McDonogh		12-07	2/1	15 lengths	Green with gold buttons, red cap
02	Scamp	Mr Clarendon	5	10-12	3/1	A distance	Royal blue with black cap
03	The Duke	Captain Martin Becher	9	12-07	1/2		Blue with black cap
