= Dan Devine =

American football player and coach (1924–2002)

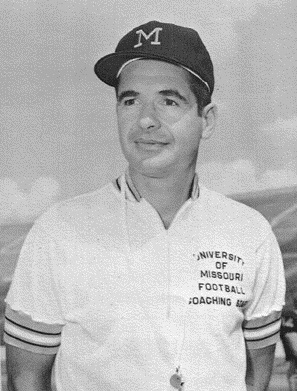
- Devine from The Savitar, 1965

Biographical details
- Born: December 23, 1924; Augusta, Wisconsin, U.S.
- Died: May 9, 2002 (aged 77); Tempe, Arizona, U.S.

Playing career
- 1946–1948: Minnesota–Duluth
- Position: Quarterback

Coaching career (HC unless noted)
- 1950–1954: Michigan State (assistant)
- 1955–1957: Arizona State
- 1958–1970: Missouri
- 1971–1974: Green Bay Packers
- 1975–1980: Notre Dame

Administrative career (AD unless noted)
- 1967–1970: Missouri
- 1971–1974: Green Bay Packers (GM)
- 1992–1994: Missouri

Head coaching record
- Overall: 173–56–9 (college); 25–27–4 (NFL)
- Bowls: 7–3

Accomplishments and honors

Championships
- 2 National (1960, 1977); 1 Border (1957); 2 Big Eight (1960, 1969)

Awards
- Big Eight Coach of the Year (1958)
- College Football Hall of Fame; Inducted in 1985 (profile)

Daniel John Devine (December 23, 1924 – May 9, 2002) was an American football player and coach. He served as the head football coach at Arizona State University from 1955 to 1957, the University of Missouri from 1958 to 1970, and the University of Notre Dame from 1975 to 1980, compiling a career college football mark of 173–56–9. Devine was also the head coach of the National Football League (NFL)'s Green Bay Packers from 1971 to 1974, tallying a mark of 25–27–4. His 1977 Notre Dame team won a national championship after beating Texas in the Cotton Bowl. Devine was inducted into the College Football Hall of Fame as a coach in 1985.

== Early life and military service ==
Born in Augusta, Wisconsin, on December 23, 1924, Devine later went to live with an aunt and uncle in Proctor, Minnesota. At Proctor High School, Devine started at quarterback as a freshman and later became known as "The Proctor Flash", a name given to him by his friend Lute Olson. Devine also competed in three other sports during his four years at the school, and graduated in 1942.

Devine then enrolled at the Duluth State Teachers College (now the University of Minnesota Duluth), and was team captain of both the basketball and football teams, playing as a 170 lb (77 kg) quarterback. His time at the school was interrupted after enlisting in the Army Air Corps during World War II, where Devine became a B-29 flight officer. He graduated from college in 1948 with a bachelor's degree in history.

== Coaching career ==
=== Early years as a coach and Michigan State ===
Devine earned his first coaching job as head coach at East Jordan High School in Michigan, reaching his interview by a combination of bus travel and hitch-hiking. Following two undefeated seasons at the school, Devine accepted an assistant position at Michigan State University in 1950 under head coach Biggie Munn. For the next five seasons, Devine helped the Spartans achieve success, including winning a national championship in 1952.

=== Arizona State ===
On February 5, 1955, Devine accepted the head coaching position at Arizona State College in Tempe. Joining him as an assistant was Frank Kush, who had even greater success at the school after Devine left. During his three years with the Sun Devils, Devine compiled a record of 27–3–1 (.887), including a spotless 10–0 mark during his final campaign in 1957; ASC led the nation in total offense and scoring in his final season, averaging just under 40 points per game in the latter category.

=== Missouri ===
Devine's success at Arizona State resulted in an offer from the University of Missouri, which he accepted on December 18, 1957. At first, Devine was reluctant to accept the position; his flight to Missouri had developed engine trouble. Devine also had hot chocolate spilled on him by a stewardess during the flight, which arrived six hours late.

Over the next 13 years, Devine turned the once-dormant program into a consistently competitive school that finished with a Top 20 ranking in the Coaches Poll nine times. His record of 93–37–7 (.704) included four bowl game victories, with his winning percentage passing that of his predecessor Don Faurot. Devine left Missouri with the second most number of wins as coach in school history, behind only Faurot. Devine is now third after being passed by Gary Pinkel in 2013.

After finishing 5–4–1 in his first year in 1958, Devine (with two years left on his contract) gained some job security when a group of Missouri alumni funded a $150,000 life insurance policy that covered him as long as he remained as head coach of the Tigers. The investment paid off as Missouri never lost more than three games per season over the next decade.

Tiger football was integrated under Devine's watch, with Norris Stevenson and Mel West becoming Mizzou's first Black scholarship athletes. Both played major roles for the team and were selected in the 1961 NFL draft.

In 1960, the Tigers began the year unranked, but after shutting out SMU 20–0 in the season opener, moved up to 16th and continued to head upward in the weekly rankings. Following that win with eight straight victories, Missouri became the top-ranked team in the country following a 41–19 victory over Oklahoma.

Needing only a victory over Kansas to clinch a national championship, the Tigers (favored by a touchdown) instead were stunned in a 23–7 upset loss. After an Orange Bowl victory over Navy on January 1, 1961, Missouri finished the year ranked fifth. Kansas was later forced to forfeit two games in a vote by Big Eight schools (3–5) because the Jayhawks' Bert Coan had received impermissible benefits from Kansas booster (and Houston Oilers owner) Bud Adams and was thus voted ineligible by the conference. The Big Eight chose not to vote on the issue mid-season, though it was known prior to the game. Missouri claims the 1960 game as a win by forfeit—thus making 1960 the only undefeated and untied season in school history.

While never again reaching that level, Missouri maintained its strength throughout the 1960s, with Devine taking on the added duties of athletic director in 1967 after Faurot stepped down from that post. During his three years in the latter role, Devine made a key hire when he selected Norm Stewart to head the fortunes of the basketball squad.

Missouri went 9–1 in the regular season in 1969, capped off with a massive 69–21 win over Kansas that saw Jayhawk head coach Pepper Rodgers showing the peace sign to Devine late in the game and Devine "return half of it". They faced Penn State in the Orange Bowl; the Nittany Lions entered the game with a 28-game winning streak and extended it by intercepting seven Tiger passes to win a 10–3 defensive battle; Missouri finished the season at 9–2.

=== Green Bay Packers ===
After suffering his first losing season in 1970, Devine left Missouri on January 14, 1971, to become the head coach and general manager of the Green Bay Packers of the NFL, succeeding Phil Bengtson.

Devine acknowledged the pressure of the position but had the benefit of the doubt since he did not immediately follow legendary coach Vince Lombardi. Bengtson had endured three years of unrealistic expectations following Lombardi's brief retirement after their Super Bowl II victory.

Devine's career in Green Bay got off to a painful start when he suffered a broken leg following a sideline collision in the season opener, a 42–40 loss to the New York Giants.

After finishing 4–8–2 in 1971, Devine headed a brief resurgence that "The Pack is Back" by dethroning the four-time division champion Minnesota Vikings in 1972 to reach the playoffs, the Packers' first post-season in five years. The Packers lost 16–3 in the first round to the Washington Redskins at RFK Stadium on Christmas Eve.

The Packers did not reach the postseason for another decade, during the expanded 16-team playoffs of the strike-shortened 1982 season. Green Bay did not return to the playoffs in a non-strike year until 1993 and did not win another divisional title until 1995. Unable to recapture the success of 1972, Devine's final two seasons at Green Bay were disappointing (5–7–2 in 1973 and 6–8 in 1974).

Midway through his last season as Packers head coach in 1974, Devine engineered a memorable trade in which Green Bay exchanged two first-round picks, two second-round picks, and a third-round pick for 34-year-old quarterback John Hadl from the Los Angeles Rams. The Packers were 3–3 at the time with lackluster play from quarterback Jerry Tagge, and Devine apparently believed an experienced quarterback was the last piece of the puzzle.

However, Hadl would play only two years as a Packer, winning just seven games while throwing 29 interceptions during that span. Meanwhile, the Rams used the picks acquired in the trade to draft players who would help them dominate the NFC West in the 1970s. To this day, many Packer fans have never forgiven Devine for the trade, which is widely reckoned as the worst trade for a starting quarterback in NFL history.

Devine's wife was diagnosed with multiple sclerosis during the season.

As the Packers' performance declined, Devine's relationship with the fans deteriorated, and his family started to get verbally harassed during games. An incident occurred where one of his dogs was shot by a neighbor. Devine claimed that the shooter was an angry Packers fan, but the farmer who shot the dog said that he did so because it had been constantly straying onto his property, and he had warned Devine in the past that he would shoot Devine's dog if it came near his home again.

After a three-game losing streak knocked the Packers out of the playoffs, Devine resigned on December 16, 1974, to become the head coach at the University of Notre Dame. His departure was also controversial, as the Packers' board of directors were prepared to buy Devine out of his contract, but Devine told them that he was going to return to coach the team in 1975. Devine asked for his last season's paycheck to come in advance, and after it was given to him, Devine announced his resignation.

=== Notre Dame ===
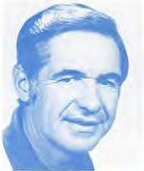
Devine in 1976

Devine had been a leading candidate for the head coaching job at Notre Dame in 1964 when Ara Parseghian was hired. When approached for the job following Parseghian's resignation a decade later, Devine accepted immediately, joking that it was probably the shortest job interview in history.

In his six seasons at Notre Dame, Devine compiled a 53–16–1 (.764) record. His lasting achievement came midway through this run when the Fighting Irish won the 1977 national championship, led by junior quarterback Joe Montana. The regular season was highlighted by the Irish's 21–17 come-from-behind win over Clemson at Death Valley when Devine repeatedly gave the middle finger salute to the raucous home crowd.

The championship season was completed with a convincing 38–10 win in the 1978 Cotton Bowl Classic over previously top-ranked Texas, led by Heisman Trophy winner Earl Campbell. The win vaulted the Irish from fifth to first in the polls.

Earlier in the season, before the annual game against USC on October 22, Devine changed the team's home jerseys from navy blue & white to kelly green & gold, which would remain for the rest of his time at the school.

Devine also added names to the players' jerseys on a permanent basis when he took over at Notre Dame. Previously, names had been included on jerseys only during bowl games. (The traditional navy blue & white jerseys without names returned in the 1980s under Lou Holtz.)

Devine's teams won three bowl games, including consecutive Cotton Bowl Classics. In the 1979 Cotton Bowl Classic, the Irish trailed 34–12 with 7:27 remaining in the game. They rallied for 23 unanswered points behind ailing senior quarterback Joe Montana for a 35–34 victory over Houston. The game, played in an unseasonal storm of freezing sleet and rain, became part of college football folklore, referred to as the Chicken Soup Game.

Because Devine had the unenviable task of following a legend, he came under heavy scrutiny while at Notre Dame, and it was felt that Devine was never fully embraced by the Notre Dame community, despite winning a national championship. After a 5–2 start in his first season, rumors of incompetence were circulated and that Devine would be dismissed and replaced by Don Shula or even Ara Parseghian (who went so far as to say he would not return to coaching under any circumstances). Even on the day of the 1977 USC game, "Dump Devine" bumper stickers were being sold outside Notre Dame Stadium. Devine also lost to his old program, a shocking 3–0 defeat to Missouri at Notre Dame in 1978.

Devine was involved in a game while at Notre Dame whose ending resulted in a rule change still in effect today. On September 15, 1979, the Irish faced Michigan in Ann Arbor in their season opener. With six seconds remaining, Michigan lined up for a game-winning field goal attempt. Notre Dame linebacker Bob Crable ran onto the backs of offensive lineman Tim Foley and defensive end Scott Zettek and was able to block the kick, preserving a 12–10 Irish victory. A new rule was implemented the following season that prohibited this tactic.

On August 15, 1980, Devine announced that he would be leaving Notre Dame at the end of the 1980 season, saying that he wanted to spend more time with his wife. Notre Dame named Gerry Faust as Devine's successor on November 24, 1980. At the time, Devine's Irish were enjoying a surprisingly successful season, with a 9–0–1 record and No. 2 ranking in the polls, behind only Georgia. However, after Faust's hiring was announced, Notre Dame lost its regular season finale at rival USC, 20–3 and then lost the Sugar Bowl to Georgia, 17–10, giving the Bulldogs their first national championship and spoiling Devine's final game as a head football coach.

== Later life and death ==
Upon retiring, Devine moved back to Arizona and became a fundraiser for Arizona State's Sun Devil Foundation. In 1985, he was elected to the College Football Hall of Fame, later returning to his old school at Missouri in 1992 as athletic director to help navigate the school through financial troubles. Devine was inducted into the inaugural class of the University of Minnesota Duluth Athletic Hall of Fame in 1991.

In 2000, Devine's wife died. His own health began to deteriorate in February 2001, when after undergoing heart surgery, Devine suffered a ruptured aorta. Fifteen months later, on May 9, 2002, he died at home at the age of 77.

== Remembrance and popular culture ==
Devine was portrayed by actor Chelcie Ross in the film Rudy. In the film, Devine is portrayed in a somewhat unfavorable light, acting as a hindrance to Daniel Ruettiger's dream of dressing for Notre Dame or appearing in a game. Devine was reported to be incensed with how he was portrayed in the film, noting that Devine had planned to allow Rudy to play all along. Devine also maintained that none of the players laid down their jerseys on his desk as a form of protest. Devine was asked by movie producers to allow his dramatized character to "play the heavy," to provide dramatic plot opportunities. While Devine agreed, he later wrote that he did not believe Ross's portrayal would be as antagonistic as it turned out in the finished film.

The University of Notre Dame erected a statue of Devine outside of Notre Dame Stadium in 2011. As of 2024, the statue, which depicts Devine holding a football in one hand and pointing upward with his other, sits outside of the stadium's Gate A, also called the Dan Devine Gate.

== Head coaching record ==
=== College ===
Year	Team	Overall	Conference	Standing	Bowl/playoffs	Coaches^{#}	AP^{°}
Arizona State Sun Devils (Border Conference) (1955–1957)
1955	Arizona State	8–2–1	4–1	2nd			
1956	Arizona State	9–1	3–1	2nd			
1957	Arizona State	10–0	4–0	1st		12	12
Arizona State:		27–3–1	11–2				
Missouri Tigers (Big Seven / Big Eight Conference) (1958–1970)
1958	Missouri	5–4–1	4–1–1	2nd			
1959	Missouri	6–5	4–2	2nd	L Orange	19	18
1960	Missouri	11–0 (Note: Missouri lost to Kansas but was later awarded win by default due to an ineligible Kansas player, (Bert Coan). The 1960 Big Eight title was retroactively awarded to Missouri.)	7–0	1st	W Orange	4	5
1961	Missouri	7–2–1	5–2	T–2nd		11	
1962	Missouri	8–1–2	5–1–1	2nd	W Bluebonnet	12	
1963	Missouri	7–3	5–2	3rd		16	
1964	Missouri	6–3–1	4–2–1	4th		18	
1965	Missouri	8–2–1	6–1	2nd	W Sugar	6	6
1966	Missouri	6–3–1	4–2–1	T–3rd			
1967	Missouri	7–3	4–3	4th			
1968	Missouri	8–3	5–2	3rd	W Gator	17	9
1969	Missouri	9–2	6–1	T–1st	L Orange	6	6
1970	Missouri	5–6	3–4	T–4th			
Missouri:		92–38–7	61–24–4				
Notre Dame Fighting Irish (NCAA Division I / I-A independent) (1975–1980)
1975	Notre Dame	8–3				17	
1976	Notre Dame	9–3			W Gator	12	12
1977	Notre Dame	11–1			W Cotton	1	1
1978	Notre Dame	9–3			W Cotton	6	7
1979	Notre Dame	7–4					
1980	Notre Dame	9–2–1			L Sugar	10	9
Notre Dame:		53–16–1					
Total:		172–57–9					
National championship Conference title Conference division title or championship game berth
^{#}Rankings from final Coaches Poll.; ^{°}Rankings from final AP Poll.

=== NFL ===
Team	Year	Regular season					Postseason			
Team	Year	Won	Lost	Ties	Win ratio	Finish	Won	Lost	Win percentage	Result
GB	1971	4	8	2	.357	4th in NFC Central	–	–	–	–
GB	1972	10	4	0	.714	1st in NFC Central	0	1	.000	Lost to Washington Redskins in NFC Divisional Game
GB	1973	5	7	2	.429	3rd in NFC Central	–	–	–	–
GB	1974	6	8	0	.429	3rd in NFC Central	–	–	–	–
Total		25	27	4	.482		0	1	.000	
