= John Devine =

John Devine may refer to:

== Sports ==
- John Devine (footballer, born 1933), English footballer
- John Devine (footballer, born 1935), Scottish footballer
- John Devine (footballer, born 1958), Irish footballer
- John Devine (footballer, born 1969), Northern Irish footballer
- John Devine (Scottish footballer), Scottish footballer
- John Devine (Australian rules footballer) (1940–2023), Australian footballer and politician
- John Devine (Gaelic footballer) (born 1983), Irish Gaelic footballer
- John Devine (rugby union) (born 2003), Irish Rugby Union player
- John Devine (jockey) who rode in the 1836 & 1837 Great Liverpool Steeplechases
- Johnny Devine, Canadian wrestler
- John Devine (cyclist) (born 1985), American racing cyclist
- John Devine (runner), winner of the 1925 NCAA two-mile championships

== Other people ==
- John C. Devine, Arizona politician
- John P. Devine (politician), Illinois politician
- John P. Devine (judge), Texas Supreme Court judge
- John M. Devine, United States Army general
