= Doug Weaver =

American football player, coach, and administrator (born 1930)

Biographical details
- Born: October 15, 1930 (age 96); Goshen, Indiana, U.S.

Playing career
- 1950–1952: Michigan State
- Position: Center

Coaching career (HC unless noted)
- 1956–1957: Michigan State (assistant)
- 1958–1959: Missouri (assistant)
- 1960–1966: Kansas State
- 1970: Kansas (assistant)
- 1971–1972: UCLA (AHC/OC)
- 1974–1975: Southern Illinois

Administrative career (AD unless noted)
- 1973–1976: Southern Illinois
- 1976–1979: Georgia Tech
- 1979–1989: Michigan State

Head coaching record
- Overall: 11–78–2

Accomplishments and honors

Championships
- National (1952)

Douglas W. Weaver (born October 15, 1930) is an American former football player, coach, and college athletics administrator. He served as the head football coach at Kansas State University from 1960 to 1966 and at Southern Illinois University Carbondale from 1974 to 1975, compiling a career college football record of 11–78–2. His Kansas State Wildcats teams posted two of the longest losing streaks in college football history. Weaver was also the athletic director at the Georgia Institute of Technology from 1976 to 1979 and at Michigan State University from 1979 to 1989.

== Career ==
Weaver starred as a center of Michigan State's great teams of the early 1950s. After graduation, he served as an assistant on Duffy Daugherty's staff at his alma mater, and at the University of Missouri under Dan Devine. Prior to the 1960 season, he was hired as the head coach at Kansas State at age 29.

=== Kansas State ===
In seven seasons at Kansas State, he compiled an 8–60–1 record. His final two seasons went without a win. His 1961 and 1962 teams posted a losing streak of 18 games—tied for the 20th-longest streak in college football history. Weaver's best season at K-State came in 1964, when his team went 3–7, with the three wins coming by a combined six points, but he retained his sense of humor. According to a Sports Illustrated article, after he was hanged in effigy at K-State, he said: "I'm glad it happened in front of the library. I've always emphasized scholarship." He was fired following the 1966 season. His career record was 8–60–1 including a 4–43-1 record in conference play.

=== Southern Illinois ===
After being fired from Kansas State, Weaver attended law school at the University of Kansas. He returned to coaching football after earning his law degree, serving as an assistant coach at Kansas under Pepper Rodgers for the 1970 season. In 1973, he was named athletic director at Southern Illinois University Carbondale. In 1974, he named himself as head football coach at Southern Illinois, where he posted records of 2–9 and 1–9–1 during the 1974 and 1975 seasons.

=== Georgia Tech and Michigan State ===
In 1976, he left Southern Illinois to take over as athletic director at the Georgia Institute of Technology. He was succeeded as athletic director at Southern Illinois by Gale Sayers. While athletic director at Georgia Tech, Weaver fired his old boss, Rodgers, from his position as football coach.

In 1980, Weaver returned to his alma mater, Michigan State, as athletic director, a position he held for a decade until he retired in 1990. Michigan State's indoor practice facility is named in his honor, and Weaver was inducted into the 2015 Class of the Michigan State Athletics Hall of Fame.

== Head coaching record ==
Year	Team	Overall	Conference	Standing
Kansas State Wildcats (Big Eight Conference) (1960–1966)
1960	Kansas State	1–9	0–7	8th
1961	Kansas State	2–8	0–7	8th
1962	Kansas State	0–10	0–7	8th
1963	Kansas State	2–7	1–5	7th
1964	Kansas State	3–7	3–4	T–5th
1965	Kansas State	0–10	0–7	8th
1966	Kansas State	0–9–1	0–6–1	T–7th
Kansas State:		8–60–1	4–43–1	
Southern Illinois Salukis (NCAA Division I independent) (1974–1975)
1974	Southern Illinois	2–9		
1975	Southern Illinois	1–9–1		
Southern Illinois:		3–18–1		
Total:		11–78–1		
