= 1970 Orange Bowl =

American college football game

- 36th Orange Bowl
- The Miami Orange Bowl in Miami, Florida, hosted the Orange Bowl.
Penn State Nittany Lions	Missouri Tigers
(10–0)	(9–1)
Independent	Big Eight
10	3
Head coach: Joe Paterno	Head coach: Dan Devine
AP / Coaches; 2 / 2	AP / Coaches; 6 / 6
	1	2	3	4	Total
Penn State	10	0	0	0	10
Missouri	0	3	0	0	3
- Date: January 1, 1970
- Season: 1969
- Stadium: Orange Bowl
- Location: Miami, Florida
- MVP: Chuck Burkhart (PSU QB); Mike Reid (PSU DT)
- Favorite: Missouri by 3 points
- Referee: Paul Bertha (ECAC) (split crew between ECAC and Big Eight)
- Halftime show: Bryce Wetwiski
- Attendance: 77,282

United States TV coverage
- Network: NBC
- Announcers: Jim Simpson, Al DeRogatis
- Nielsen ratings: 27.3

The 1970 Orange Bowl was the 36th edition of the college football bowl game, played at the Orange Bowl in Miami, Florida, on Thursday, January 1. The final game of the 1969–70 bowl game season, it matched the independent and second-ranked Penn State Nittany Lions and the #6 Missouri Tigers of the Big Eight Conference.

A slight underdog, Penn State scored early and won, 10–3.

== Teams ==
=== Penn State ===
The Nittany Lions entered the game on a 21-game winning streak, and were unbeaten in their last 29 games. This was Penn State's second straight Orange Bowl appearance, after they declined an invitation to play top-ranked Texas in the Cotton Bowl.

=== Missouri ===
Missouri was co-champion of the Big Eight for the first time since 1960; through 2021, this remains their most recent conference championship. This was Missouri's third Orange Bowl appearance in ten years; the most recent was nine years earlier.

== Game summary ==
This was the sixth straight year for a night kickoff at the Orange Bowl, following the Rose Bowl.

A field goal by Mike Reitz gave the Nittany Lions an early lead. After the ensuing kickoff, the Tigers' Joe Moore was hit in the backfield and fumbled on the first play and Penn State recovered. On the next play, quarterback Chuck Burkhart threw a 28-yard touchdown pass to halfback Lydell Mitchell, giving them a 10–0 lead in the first quarter. Missouri had more turnovers (nine, including seven interceptions) than points (a field goal from 33 yards by Henry Brown, scored in the second quarter).

The second half was scoreless and it rained in the fourth quarter. Missouri threatened late, with a first down at the Penn State fifteen with less than two minutes remaining, but resulted in the seventh interception on third down, returned from the two to across midfield. Penn State clinched their second straight undefeated season, but due to Texas' victory in the Cotton Bowl earlier in the day, the Longhorns were declared Associated Press national champions.

=== Scoring ===
First quarter

- Penn State – Mike Reitz 29-yard field goal
- Penn State – Lydell Mitchell 28-yard pass from Chuck Burkhart (Reitz kick);

Second quarter

- Missouri – Henry Brown 33-yard field goal

Third quarter
No scoring
Fourth quarter
No scoring

== Statistics ==
Statistics	Penn State	Missouri
First downs	12	13
Rushes–yards	54–57	43–189
Passing yards	187	117
Passes (C–A–I)	12–26–1	6–28–7
Total Offense	80–244	71–306
Punts–average	12–43.1	6–44.7
Fumbles–lost	0–0	4–2
Turnovers	1	9
Penalties–yards	5–40	3–25

== Aftermath ==
The Nittany Lions returned to the Orange Bowl four years later. Missouri head coach Dan Devine left after the following season for the NFL's Green Bay Packers, and the Tigers wouldn't appear in a major bowl until the 2023 Cotton Bowl Classic (December). (NOTE: Missouri played in the Fiesta Bowl in 1972 and the Cotton Bowl in 2008 and 2014, but those were not considered major bowls at the time played. The Fiesta achieved major bowl status by becoming part of the Bowl Coalition in 1992; the Cotton, which lost its major status in 1995 due to the dissolution of the Southwest Conference, regained major status when it became part of the College Football Playoff rotation in 2014.)

This was the last Orange Bowl played on natural grass for seven years; the stadium installed artificial turf (Poly-Turf) prior to the next season.
