= 1960 Nebraska Cornhuskers football team =

American college football season

1960 Nebraska Cornhuskers football
- Conference: Big Eight Conference
- Record: 4–6 (2–5 Big 8)
- Head coach: Bill Jennings (4th season)
- Offensive scheme: Wing T
- Home stadium: Memorial Stadium

1960 Big Eight Conference football standings
	Conf.					Overall
Team	W		L		T	W		L		T
No. 5 Missouri $	7	–	0	–	0	11	–	0	–	0
No. 11 Kansas†	6	–	0	–	1	7	–	2	–	1
Colorado	6	–	1	–	0	7	–	3	–	0
Iowa State	4	–	3	–	0	7	–	3	–	0
Oklahoma	2	–	4	–	1	3	–	6	–	1
Nebraska	2	–	5	–	0	4	–	6	–	0
Oklahoma State	2	–	5	–	0	3	–	7	–	0
Kansas State	0	–	7	–	0	1	–	9	–	0
$ – Conference champion; † Kansas' conference victories against Colorado and Missouri were forfeited by Big Eight sanctions, though both are recognized as Kansas victories by Kansas and the NCAA.; Rankings from AP Poll

The 1960 Nebraska Cornhuskers football team was the representative of the University of Nebraska and member of the Big Eight Conference in the 1960 college football season. The team was coached by Bill Jennings and played their home games at Memorial Stadium in Lincoln, Nebraska.

== Before the season ==
The mixed fortunes of Nebraska football under coach Jennings were a continuing source of uncertainty. In the three previous years of his tenure, two distinct faces of the program appeared depending often upon who the opponent was. Stunning victories over favored teams were frequently followed or preceded by demoralizing losses to underperforming or average conference foes. Jennings had record clear losing records in all three seasons, finishing last or 2nd to last in the league, yet managed to secure epic wins against powerhouse rivals such as Minnesota and Pittsburgh, and even snapped Oklahoma's 13-year, 74-game conference winning streak. For his fifth year, the Nebraska football schedule opened with a tough road game against #4 Texas, but was then favorable with four straight home stands, and the only other major looming threat was the final game with Oklahoma, in Norman.

== Schedule ==
Date	Time	Opponent	Rank	Site	Result	Attendance	Source
September 17	7:30 pm	at No. 4 Texas*		Memorial Stadium; Austin, TX	W 14–13	37,702	
September 24	2:00 pm	Minnesota*	No. 12	Memorial Stadium; Lincoln, NE (rivalry)	L 14–26	39,363	
October 1	2:00 pm	Iowa State		Memorial Stadium; Lincoln, NE (rivalry)	L 7–10	32,262	
October 8	2:00 pm	Kansas State		Memorial Stadium; Lincoln, NE (rivalry)	W 17–7	35,102	
October 15	2:00 pm	Army*		Memorial Stadium; Lincoln, NE	W 14–9	36,244–39,000	
October 22	3:00 pm	at Colorado		Folsom Field; Boulder, CO (rivalry)	L 6–19	40,409	
October 29	2:00 pm	No. 5 Missouri^{†}		Memorial Stadium; Lincoln, NE (rivalry)	L 0–28	34,581	
November 5	1:30 pm	at Kansas		Memorial Stadium; Lawrence, KS (rivalry)	L 0–31	29,552	
November 12	2:00 pm	Oklahoma State		Memorial Stadium; Lincoln, NE	L 6–7	27,421	
November 19	2:00 pm	at Oklahoma		Oklahoma Memorial Stadium; Norman, OK (rivalry)	W 17–14	42,701	
*Non-conference game; ^{†}Homecoming; Rankings from AP Poll released prior to the game; All times are in Central time; Source:

== Roster ==
Official Roster
86 Bond, John E (Sr.); 22 Bonistall, Ernie QB (So.); 75 Borer, Ron RT (So.); 61 Burd, Jim RG (So.); 62 Carlson, Dwain LG (So.); 84 Carroll, Bob E (So.); 19 Case, Phil E (So.); 44 Clare, Patrick HB (Jr.); 10 Claridge, Dennis QB (So.); 41 Clay, Bernie HB (So.); 49 Cobb, Archie RT (So.); 80 Comstock, William E (So.); 55 Cooper, Darrell LG (Sr.); 23 Dillard, Bennie HB (Jr.); 57 Donovan, Larry E (So.); 18 Drum, Mic E (So.); 43 Dyer, Dallas QB (Jr.); 53 Eissler, Ron C (So.); 11 Faiman, John QB (So.); 40 Fischer, Pat QB (Sr.); 64 Fischer, Allen (Richard) LG (So.); 34 Fisher, Fred FB (So.); 50 Fricke, Donald C (Sr.); 69 Fuehrer, Paul RG (So.); 79 Gacusana, Joe LG (Sr.); 31 Hamsa, R.J. C (So.); 71 Haney, George LT (Jr.); 17 Heldt, Don RT (So.); 85 Huge, James E (So.); 73 Janovy, Leon E (Jr.); 74 Jones, Robert RT (So.); 47 Jordan, Don RG (Jr.); 77 Kiffin, Monte LT (So.)	54 Kitchen, Robert C (Sr.); 63 Kosier, Richard RG (Sr.); 76 Krause, Dick LG (Jr.); 52 Krause, Larry C (So.); 16 Larsen, Gary HB (So.); 13 Little, Jim QB (So.); 81 Macdonald, Bill E (So.); 32 Martin, Noel FB (Jr.); 88 McDaniel, Richard E (Jr.); 78 McDole, Ron RT (Sr.); 20 Meade, Ron QB (Jr.); 66 Michka, Ron C (So.); 12 Myers, Rogers HB (So.); 35 Olsen, Steve FB (So.); 68 Ponsiego, John LG (Sr.); 15 Powers, Warren HB (So.); 82 Purcell, Donald E (Jr.); 42 Raschke, Jim LT (Jr.); 65 Robertson, Tyrone RG (So.); 88 Salerno, Patrick E (Jr.); 72 Schachel, Bill LT (So.); Stuewe, Dennis HB; 30 Bill Thornton FB (So.); 51 Tingelhoff, Mick C (Jr.); 83 Tomlinson, Larry E (So.); 67 Toogood, Gary RG (Jr.); 45 Ward, Gene HB (Jr.); 21 Warden, Gary HB (So.); 70 Wellman, Allen RT (Sr.); 14 White, Clay HB (Sr.); 48 Williams, Pete LG (So.); 46 Young, Brice E (So.)

== 1960 Depth Chart ==
Defense by committee
HB	HB
	LB / LB
CB	DE / DT / NT / DT / DE	CB

Offensive starters

LE
William Comstock
James Huge
Larry Donovan

LG	C	RG	LT	RT
Darrell Cooper	Donald Fricke	Dick Kosier	Robert Jones	Ron McDole
Tyrone Robertson	Mick Tingelhoff	Dwaine Carlson	George Haney	Gary Toogood

RE
Donald Purcell
Pat Salerno

QB
Pat Fischer
John Faiman

LB	RB	FB
Bernie Clay	Clay White	Bill Thornton
Bennie Dillard	Patrick Clare	Noel Martin

== Coaching staff ==
Name	Title	First year in this position	Years at Nebraska	Alma mater
Bill Jennings	Head coach	1957	1956–1961	Oklahoma
Don Scarbrough	Assistant coach	1956	1956–1961	
Dick Monroe		1957	1957–1961	
LeRoy Pearce		1958	1958–1961	
Cletus Fischer		1960	1960–1985	Nebraska
George Kelly		1960	1960–1968	
Jack Braley		1960	1960–1961	Nebraska

== Game summaries ==
=== Texas ===
Team	1	2	3	4	Total
• Nebraska	0	6	8	0	14
#4 Texas	7	0	0	6	13

- Date: September 17
- Location: Texas Memorial Stadium • Austin, Texas
- Game attendance: 37,702

Nebraska's record of surprise victories was extended once again when the Cornhuskers fought #4 Texas to a near draw, scraping out the win by a single point under the guidance of Pat Fischer, who had converted to QB in the offseason. Nebraska set a new team record for defeat of a highly ranked team, besting the 14–13 road win over #7 Kansas in 1952. The win moved the Cornhuskers to 2–1 in the series, and prompted the AP Poll to move Nebraska into the rankings for the first time since 1954.

=== Minnesota ===
Team	1	2	Total
• Minnesota			26
#12 Nebraska			14

- Date: September 24
- Location: Memorial Stadium • Lincoln, Nebraska
- Game attendance: 39,363

Minnesota had long dominated the series between these teams, and was coming off the uncommon loss to Nebraska when they met in Lincoln. The Cornhuskers failed to live up to their recent billing as the #12 team in the land, as the unranked Golden Gophers ran over around and through the outgunned Nebraska line. The 14 Cornhusker points were put up inside of two minutes of the third quarter, one thanks to an interception, but the rest of the day belonged to Minnesota. The Cornhuskers gave up their short-lived appearance in the polls and were now just 6–29–2 in the series. Minnesota used this win as a springboard, going on to finish the season ranked #1 as the AP national champions, though they subsequently lost to #6 Washington 7–17 in the 1961 Rose Bowl.

=== Iowa State ===
Team	1	2	3	4	Total
• Iowa State	0	7	3	0	10
Nebraska	7	0	0	0	7

- Location: Memorial Stadium, Lincoln, Nebraska
- Game attendance: 32,262
- Game weather: Windy

The first conference game for Nebraska started with promise, thanks to a high wind. A Cyclone punt traveled for only twelve yards into the wind, giving the Cornhuskers favorable field position on the Iowa State 29 and quickly leading to a touchdown in the first quarter. Following that, the Cyclones brought the score even with a touchdown before the break. Try as they might to recover the lead, Nebraska was unable to get a score, while allowing Iowa State what would be the game-winning field goal. Nebraska still dominated the series, 42–11–1.

=== Kansas State ===
Team	1	2	Total
Kansas State			7
• Nebraska			17

- Date: October 8
- Location: Memorial Stadium • Lincoln, Nebraska
- Game attendance: 35,102

Nebraska secured the first league victory against Kansas State thanks a great deal to three key running plays by HB Bennie Dillard that rolled up 43 yards to score two touchdowns and set up a third. The Cornhusker triumph also snapped a three-game home field losing stretch to the Wildcats and moved Nebraska to 33–9–2 against Kansas State all time.

=== Army ===
Team	1	2	3	4	Total
Army	3	6	0	0	9
• Nebraska	0	7	7	0	14

- Location: Memorial Stadium, Lincoln, Nebraska
- Game attendance: 36,244

The Cadets struck first with a field goal, and disaster soon followed when Army then recovered a Nebraska fumble on the Cornhusker 5 yard line and promptly converted it into Nebraska's first-ever touchdown against the Cadets. Down 9–0, just two plays later, Nebraska QB Pat Fischer successfully faked a pass before running 64 yards to the Army 14, and soon enough the Cornhuskers were back in it, 9–7. After the halftime break, another bit of trickery by Fischer allowed a 57-yard pass to HB Dillard for another touchdown. The Cadet squad was far more productive than Nebraska on the day, snagging an interception, outyarding them 324–198, and tallying a first down advantage of 18–5. Despite the battle of statistics favoring Army, two outstanding defensive stands by the Cornhuskers on the 5 yard line kept Army scoreless until time expired on a last-ditch Cadet pass play into the end zone that was knocked away and incomplete. The win was Nebraska's first against Army in three attempts.

=== Colorado ===
Team	1	2	Total
Nebraska			6
• Colorado			19

- Date: October 22
- Location: Folsom Field • Boulder, Colorado
- Game attendance: 40,409

Playing in the high altitude at Boulder, the Cornhuskers attempted to make a game of it, pulling up to a 6–6 tie in the second quarter. Nebraska's momentum would be broken and never recovered shortly after when the Buffaloes returned a kickoff 95 yards for a touchdown to go ahead for good. Finally, in the fourth quarter, the Cornhuskers had a chance to tie the game on two occasions, but came away empty-handed on both attempts. Colorado's win brought them back to within a game of catching Nebraska in the series, at 9–10–0.

=== Missouri ===
Team	1	2	Total
• #5 Missouri			28
Nebraska			0

- Date: October 29
- Location: Memorial Stadium • Lincoln, Nebraska
- Game attendance: 34,581

Nebraska was nursing a 3–3 record, just 1–2 in the Big 8, when #5 Missouri came to Lincoln. While Nebraska seemed, under the guidance of Bill Jennings, as a likely victor in a game no one would normally expect them to win, this matchup failed to follow the pattern of Cornhusker upsets. The Tigers rolled over the Cornhusker line almost at will, rolling up 28 unanswered points. As time waned, Missouri gave up a fumble that the Cornhuskers eventually managed to bring to the Tiger 7-yard line. Forced to turn the ball back over on downs, Missouri ran the clock out and handed down a shutout defeat to Nebraska. The Tigers moved to 22–28–3 in the series, and kept the Missouri-Nebraska Bell for the fourth straight year. The Tigers went on to finish the season 11–0 and ranked #5 by the AP Poll, and defeated #4 Navy 21–14 in the 1961 Orange Bowl.

=== Kansas ===
Team	1	2	Total
Nebraska			0
• Kansas			31

- Date: November 5
- Location: Memorial Stadium • Lawrence, Kansas
- Game attendance: 29,552

After the surprise 1959 upset of Oklahoma by the Cornhuskers in 1959, the Sooners had not yet recovered and were in a spiral downward. Smelling a chance at a conference title for the first time in well over a decade, Kansas brought their full effort against the Cornhuskers in Lawrence. Nebraska's first and only break came on a fumble lost by the Jayhawks early on, but the Kansas defense promptly stopped the series. The Cornhuskers were unable to get past the Kansas 35 yard line until late in the 4th quarter when the game was already out of reach, and still the Jawhawks held firm. The 0–31 blanking was the worst-ever defeat Kansas had dealt to Nebraska in their series that dated to 1892, though it still belonged to the Cornhuskers at 46–17–3. Kansas went on to finish strong, 5–4–1 and ranked #11 by the AP Poll.

=== Oklahoma State ===
Team	1	2	3	4	Total
• Oklahoma State	0	0	0	7	7
Nebraska	6	0	0	0	6

- Location: Memorial Stadium, Lincoln, Nebraska
- Game attendance: 27,421

Oklahoma State and Nebraska were briefly members of the same conference from 1925 to 1928 before the MVIAA reorganized into the Big 6, though they had not met on the field before today. Now that the Cowboys (formerly the Aggies) were back, the league was now known as the Big 8. Coach Jennings showed a new look to first-time opponent OSU, attacking in the double wing T for the first time. The Cowboys quickly adjusted, however, and were still able to stifle the Cornhusker offense. Nebraska QB Pat Fischer returned an early punt for a touchdown to go ahead, but all other attempts to score fell short. Nebraska succeeded in hanging onto the lead until late in the fourth, when Fischer allowed a fumble to be lost to Oklahoma State. The Cowboys, who had managed to get into Nebraska territory only one other time in the entire game so far, subsequently converted the turnover into a touchdown. The successful point after sealed the outcome.

=== Oklahoma ===
Team	1	2	3	4	Total
• Nebraska	0	0	8	9	17
Oklahoma	7	7	0	0	14

- Location: Oklahoma Memorial Stadium, Norman, Oklahoma
- Game attendance: 42,701

Oklahoma's 13-year high-flying domination of the league came crashing to a halt after Nebraska's shocking defeat of the Sooners to close out 1959, and Oklahoma had still not quite recovered. Limping into the game with a 2–3–1 conference record unprecedented in recent history, the Sooners were bent on revenge against the team that had started the downward spiral. Oklahoma jumped out to a 14–0 lead by halftime before Nebraska came together to mount a counterattack. Holding the Sooners off for the rest of the game, and helped by a sensational 68 yard touchdown run, the Cornhuskers scratched up 17 points to take their second straight victory against Oklahoma. The struggling Oklahoma squad ended their season with four straight conference defeats, and their series with Nebraska was again tied at 18–18–3.

== After the season ==
Coach Jennings completed his fourth straight year of unpredictable levels of success. Despite once again pulling off unlikely upsets, against Texas and Army, and defeating Oklahoma for the program's first back-to-back wins over the Sooners since 1942, the Cornhuskers again fell flat in the conference and managed only a tie for 6th place. Although this was Coach Jennings' fourth straight losing season, he still managed to accumulate slightly improved records, with 6–19–0 (.240) in the Big 8 and 12–28–0 (.300) overall. The Cornhuskers now stood at 152–77–12 (.656) all time in conference, and slipped to 363–217–34 (.619) overall, a record tenth straight year of decline. Still, despite owning the third-worst career coaching in the history of the program among coaches with more than one year at the helm, the university opted to keep Jennings aboard for 1961.

Ranking movements Legend: ██ Increase in ranking ██ Decrease in ranking — = Not ranked
	Week											
Poll	Pre	1	2	3	4	5	6	7	8	9	10	Final
AP	—	—	12	—	—	—	—	—	—	—	—	—

== Future professional players ==
- Dennis Claridge, 1963 3rd-round pick of the Green Bay Packers
- Pat Fischer, 1961 17th-round pick of the St. Louis Cardinals
- Bob Jones, 1964 18th-round pick of the Washington Redskins
- Monte Kiffin, 1964 15th-round pick of the Minnesota Vikings
- Ron McDole, 1961 4th-round pick of the St. Louis Cardinals
- Bill (Thunder) Thornton, 1963 5th-round pick of the St. Louis Cardinals
- Mick Tingelhoff, Minnesota Vikings
