= 1960 Kansas Jayhawks football team =

American college football season

1960 Kansas Jayhawks football
- Conference: Big Eight Conference

Ranking
- Coaches: No. T–9
- AP: No. 11
- Record: 5–4–1 (4–2–1 Big 8)
- Head coach: Jack Mitchell (3rd season)
- Captain: Doyle Schick
- Home stadium: Memorial Stadium

1960 Big Eight Conference football standings
	Conf.					Overall
Team	W		L		T	W		L		T
No. 5 Missouri $	7	–	0	–	0	11	–	0	–	0
No. 11 Kansas†	6	–	0	–	1	7	–	2	–	1
Colorado	6	–	1	–	0	7	–	3	–	0
Iowa State	4	–	3	–	0	7	–	3	–	0
Oklahoma	2	–	4	–	1	3	–	6	–	1
Nebraska	2	–	5	–	0	4	–	6	–	0
Oklahoma State	2	–	5	–	0	3	–	7	–	0
Kansas State	0	–	7	–	0	1	–	9	–	0
$ – Conference champion; † Kansas' conference victories against Colorado and Missouri were forfeited by Big Eight sanctions, though both are recognized as Kansas victories by Kansas and the NCAA.; Rankings from AP Poll

The 1960 Kansas Jayhawks football team represented the University of Kansas during the 1960 college football season. The Jayhawks were led by third-year head coach Jack Mitchell and played their home games at Memorial Stadium in Lawrence, Kansas.

Kansas started the season with an upset over No. 11 TCU, shooting them up the polls. Losses were suffered to two top-two teams in No. 2 Syracuse and No 1. Iowa, as well as a tie to Oklahoma. The Jayhawks ended the regular season with an upset victory over their arch-rivals and previously-undefeated and top-ranked Missouri. Their victory earned them their first outright Big Eight Conference championship since 1930 and an invitation to the Orange Bowl. They finished No. 11 in the final AP Poll, their second ever ranked finish, and first since 1947.

Controversy surrounded the end of the season, however, as Kansas was found to have fielded an ineligible player, Bert Coan, in their games against Colorado and Missouri. The Big 8 Conference considers those games to be forfeits by Kansas, though Kansas and the NCAA recognize Kansas' on-field victories. The forfeited games remain a topic of dispute in the Border War.

== Schedule ==
Date	Opponent	Rank	Site	Result	Attendance	Source
September 17	No. 11 TCU*		Memorial Stadium; Lawrence, KS	W 21–7	32,000	
September 24	at Kansas State	No. 7	Memorial Stadium; Manhattan, KS (rivalry)	W 41–0	15,000	
October 1	No. 2 Syracuse*	No. 5	Memorial Stadium; Lawrence, KS	L 7–14	40,000	
October 8	at Iowa State	No. 10	Clyde Williams Field; Ames, IA	W 28–14	16,277	
October 15	Oklahoma	No. 9	Memorial Stadium; Lawrence, KS	T 13–13	40,000	
October 22	at Oklahoma State	No. 15	Lewis Field; Stillwater, OK	W 14–7	30,000	
October 29	at No. 1 Iowa*	No. 19	Iowa Stadium; Iowa City, IA	L 7–21	47,000	
November 5	Nebraska		Memorial Stadium; Lawrence, KS (rivalry)	W 31–0	29,552	
November 12	Colorado^{†}		Memorial Stadium; Lawrence, KS	F 34–6 (forfeit)	33,000	
November 19	at No. 1 Missouri		Memorial Stadium; Columbia, MO (Border War)	F 23–7 (forfeit)	43,000	
*Non-conference game; ^{†}Homecoming; Rankings from AP Poll released prior to the game; Source:
