= 1960 Colorado Buffaloes football team =

American college football season

1960 Colorado Buffaloes football
- Conference: Big Eight Conference
- Record: 7–3 (6–1 Big 8)
- Head coach: Sonny Grandelius (2nd season)
- MVP: Joe Romig
- Captain: Bill Elkins
- Home stadium: Folsom Field

1960 Big Eight Conference football standings
	Conf.					Overall
Team	W		L		T	W		L		T
No. 5 Missouri $	7	–	0	–	0	11	–	0	–	0
No. 11 Kansas†	6	–	0	–	1	7	–	2	–	1
Colorado	6	–	1	–	0	7	–	3	–	0
Iowa State	4	–	3	–	0	7	–	3	–	0
Oklahoma	2	–	4	–	1	3	–	6	–	1
Nebraska	2	–	5	–	0	4	–	6	–	0
Oklahoma State	2	–	5	–	0	3	–	7	–	0
Kansas State	0	–	7	–	0	1	–	9	–	0
$ – Conference champion; † Kansas' conference victories against Colorado and Missouri were forfeited by Big Eight sanctions, though both are recognized as Kansas victories by Kansas and the NCAA.; Rankings from AP Poll

The 1960 Colorado Buffaloes football team was an American football team that represented the University of Colorado in the Big Eight Conference during the 1960 college football season. Led by second-year head coach Sonny Grandelius, the Buffaloes compiled an overall record of 7–3 with a conference mark of 6–1 placing third in the Big 8. Big Eight official stripped Kansas of their win over Colorado, but both schools and the NCAA credit the win to Kansas, yet place Colorado second in the conference standings and Kansas third. Home games were played on campus at Folsom Field in Boulder, Colorado.

For the first time since joining the conference in 1948, Colorado defeated both Oklahoma and Nebraska in the same season; they tied both in 1952.

== Schedule ==
Date	Opponent	Rank	Site	Result	Attendance	Source
September 24	at Baylor*		Baylor Stadium; Waco, TX	L 0–26	29,000	
October 1	Kansas State		Folsom Field; Boulder, CO (rivalry)	W 27–7	23,500	
October 8	Arizona*		Folsom Field; Boulder, CO	W 35–16	34,153	
October 15	at Iowa State		Clyde Williams Field; Ames, IA	W 21–6	17,205	
October 22	Nebraska^{†}		Folsom Field; Boulder, CO (rivalry)	W 19–6	40,409	
October 29	Oklahoma		Folsom Field; Boulder, CO	W 7–0	45,281	
November 5	at No. 2 Missouri	No. 18	Memorial Stadium; Columbia, MO	L 6–16	37,500	
November 12	at Kansas		Memorial Stadium; Lawrence, KS	W 6–34 (Kansas forfeit)^{Δ}	33,000	
November 19	at Oklahoma State		Lewis Field; Stillwater, OK	W 13–6	22,000	
November 26	Air Force*		Folsom Field; Boulder, CO	L 6–16	39,000–39,140	
*Non-conference game; ^{†}Homecoming; ^{Δ} (Kansas forfeited); Rankings from AP Poll released prior to the game; Source:

== Coaching staff ==
- Bob Ghilotti (ends)
- Chuck Boerio (defense)
- Carl "Buck" Nystrom (line)
- John Polonchek (backs)
