= 1960 Oklahoma State Cowboys football team =

American college football season

1960 Oklahoma State Cowboys football
- Conference: Big Eight Conference
- Record: 3–7 (2–5 Big 8)
- Head coach: Cliff Speegle (6th season)
- Home stadium: Lewis Field

1960 Big Eight Conference football standings
	Conf.					Overall
Team	W		L		T	W		L		T
No. 5 Missouri $	7	–	0	–	0	11	–	0	–	0
No. 11 Kansas†	6	–	0	–	1	7	–	2	–	1
Colorado	6	–	1	–	0	7	–	3	–	0
Iowa State	4	–	3	–	0	7	–	3	–	0
Oklahoma	2	–	4	–	1	3	–	6	–	1
Nebraska	2	–	5	–	0	4	–	6	–	0
Oklahoma State	2	–	5	–	0	3	–	7	–	0
Kansas State	0	–	7	–	0	1	–	9	–	0
$ – Conference champion; † Kansas' conference victories against Colorado and Missouri were forfeited by Big Eight sanctions, though both are recognized as Kansas victories by Kansas and the NCAA.; Rankings from AP Poll

The 1960 Oklahoma State Cowboys football team represented Oklahoma State University–Stillwater during the 1960 college football season. The 1960 season was Oklahoma State's first as a member of the Big Eight Conference. In their sixth season under head coach Cliff Speegle, the Cowboys compiled a 3–7 record (2–5 against conference opponents), tied for sixth place in the conference, and were outscored by opponents by a combined total of 126 to 102.

On offense, the 1960 team averaged 10.2 points scored, 186.2 rushing yards, and 26.0 passing yards per game. On defense, the team allowed an average of 12.6 points scored, 196.4 rushing yards, and 64.0 passing yards per game The team's statistical leaders included Jim Dillard with 631 rushing yards and 20 points scored, Jim Elliott with 90 passing yards, and Tommy Jackson with 110 receiving yards.

Tackle Harold Beaty was selected as a first-team All-Big Eight Conference player.

The team played its home games at Lewis Field in Stillwater, Oklahoma.

== Schedule ==
Date	Opponent	Site	Result	Attendance	Source
September 17	at No. 19 Arkansas*	War Memorial Stadium; Little Rock, AR	L 0–9	38,000	
September 24	at No. 16 Missouri	Memorial Stadium; Columbia, MO	L 7–28	26,000	
October 8	at Tulsa*	Skelly Stadium; Tulsa, OK (rivalry)	W 28–7	16,238	
October 15	at Houston*	Rice Stadium; Houston, TX	L 7–12	15,000	
October 22	No. 15 Kansas^{†}	Lewis Field; Stillwater, OK	L 7–14	30,000	
October 29	Iowa State	Lewis Field; Stillwater, OK	L 6–13	17,042	
November 5	at Kansas State	Memorial Stadium; Manhattan, KS	W 28–7	9,000	
November 12	at Nebraska	Memorial Stadium; Lincoln, NE	W 7–6	27,421	
November 19	Colorado	Lewis Field; Stillwater, OK	L 6–13	22,000	
November 26	Oklahoma	Lewis Field; Stillwater, OK (Bedlam Series)	L 6–17	32,381	
*Non-conference game; ^{†}Homecoming; Rankings from AP Poll released prior to the game; Source:

== After the season ==
The 1961 NFL draft was held on December 27–28, 1960. The following Cowboys were selected.

Round	Pick	Player	Position	NFL club
3	32	Harold Beaty	Guard	Los Angeles Rams
6	79	Frank Parker	Tackle	Cleveland Browns
