= 1960 Iowa State Cyclones football team =

American college football season

1960 Iowa State Cyclones football
- Conference: Big Eight Conference
- Record: 7–3 (4–3 Big 8)
- Head coach: Clay Stapleton (3rd season)
- Captain: Arden Esslinger
- Home stadium: Clyde Williams Field

1960 Big Eight Conference football standings
	Conf.					Overall
Team	W		L		T	W		L		T
No. 5 Missouri $	7	–	0	–	0	11	–	0	–	0
No. 11 Kansas†	6	–	0	–	1	7	–	2	–	1
Colorado	6	–	1	–	0	7	–	3	–	0
Iowa State	4	–	3	–	0	7	–	3	–	0
Oklahoma	2	–	4	–	1	3	–	6	–	1
Nebraska	2	–	5	–	0	4	–	6	–	0
Oklahoma State	2	–	5	–	0	3	–	7	–	0
Kansas State	0	–	7	–	0	1	–	9	–	0
$ – Conference champion; † Kansas' conference victories against Colorado and Missouri were forfeited by Big Eight sanctions, though both are recognized as Kansas victories by Kansas and the NCAA.; Rankings from AP Poll

The 1960 Iowa State Cyclones football team represented Iowa State University in the Big Eight Conference during the 1960 college football season. In their third year under head coach Clay Stapleton, the Cyclones compiled a 7–3 record (4–3 against conference opponents), finished in fourth place in the conference, and outscored their opponents by a combined total of 185 to 136. They played their home games at Clyde Williams Field in Ames, Iowa.

The regular starting lineup on offense consisted of left ended Larry Montre, left tackle Ron Walter, left guard Dick Scensiak, center Arden Esslinger, right guard Dan Celoni, right tackle Larry Van Der Heyden, right end Don Webb, quarterback Cliff Rick, left halfback Dave Hoppmann, right halfback J.W. Burden, and fullback Tom Watkins. Gary Ellis was the punter, and Cliff Rick was the placekicker. Arden Esslinger was the team captain.

The team's statistical leaders included Dave Hoppmann with 844 rushing yards and 214 passing yards, Don Webb with 203 receiving yards, and Tom Watkins with 60 points scored (10 touchdowns) each. Tom Watkins was selected as a first-team all-conference player.

== Schedule ==
Date	Time	Opponent	Site	Result	Attendance	Source
September 17	1:30 pm	Drake*	Clyde Williams Field; Ames, IA	W 46–0	14,686	
September 23	7:15 pm	at Detroit*	University of Detroit Stadium; Detroit, MI	W 44–21	14,609	
October 1	2:00 pm	at Nebraska	Memorial Stadium; Lincoln, NE (rivalry)	W 10–7	32,262	
October 8	1:30 pm	No. 10 Kansas	Clyde Williams Field; Ames, IA	L 14–28	16,277	
October 15	1:30 pm	Colorado^{†}	Clyde Williams Field; Ames, IA	L 6–21	17,205	
October 22	1:30 pm	at No. 5 Missouri	Memorial Stadium; Columbia, MO (rivalry)	L 8–34	33,683	
October 29	2:00 pm	at Oklahoma State	Lewis Field; Stillwater, OK	W 13–6	17,042	
November 5	1:30 pm	Oklahoma	Clyde Williams Field; Ames, IA	W 10–6	15,451	
November 12	1:30 pm	at Kansas State	Memorial Stadium; Manhattan, KS (rivalry)	W 20–7	7,649	
November 19	10:00 pm	at Pacific (CA)*	Pacific Memorial Stadium; Stockton, CA	W 14–6	6,500	
*Non-conference game; ^{†}Homecoming; Rankings from AP Poll released prior to the game; All times are in Central time; Source:
