= 1960 Kansas State Wildcats football team =

American college football season

1960 Kansas State Wildcats football
- Conference: Big Eight Conference
- Record: 1–9 (0–7 Big 8)
- Head coach: Doug Weaver (1st season)
- Home stadium: Memorial Stadium

1960 Big Eight Conference football standings
| | Conf. | | | | | Overall |
| Team | W | | L | | T | W | | L | | T |
|---|---|---|---|---|---|---|---|---|---|---|
| No. 5 Missouri $ | 7 | – | 0 | – | 0 | 11 | – | 0 | – | 0 |
| No. 11 Kansas† | 6 | – | 0 | – | 1 | 7 | – | 2 | – | 1 |
| Colorado | 6 | – | 1 | – | 0 | 7 | – | 3 | – | 0 |
| Iowa State | 4 | – | 3 | – | 0 | 7 | – | 3 | – | 0 |
| Oklahoma | 2 | – | 4 | – | 1 | 3 | – | 6 | – | 1 |
| Nebraska | 2 | – | 5 | – | 0 | 4 | – | 6 | – | 0 |
| Oklahoma State | 2 | – | 5 | – | 0 | 3 | – | 7 | – | 0 |
| Kansas State | 0 | – | 7 | – | 0 | 1 | – | 9 | – | 0 |
$ – Conference champion; † Kansas' conference victories against Colorado and Missouri were forfeited by Big Eight sanctions, though both are recognized as Kansas victories by Kansas and the NCAA.; Rankings from AP Poll

The 1960 Kansas State Wildcats football team represented Kansas State University in the 1960 college football season. The team's head football coach was Doug Weaver. It was Weaver's first season at the helm of the Wildcats. The Wildcats played their home games in Memorial Stadium. The Wildcats finished the season with a 1–9 record with a 0–7 record in conference play. They finished in eighth place. The Wildcats scored just 78 points and gave up 316 points.

== Schedule ==
| Date | Opponent | Site | Result | Attendance | Source |
|---|---|---|---|---|---|
| September 17 | South Dakota State* | Memorial Stadium; Manhattan, KS | W 20–6 | 11,000 | |
| September 23 | No. 7 Kansas | Memorial Stadium; Manhattan, KS (rivalry) | L 0–41 | 15,000 | |
| October 1 | at Colorado | Folsom Field; Boulder, CO (rivalry) | L 7–27 | 23,500 | |
| October 8 | at Nebraska | Memorial Stadium; Lincoln, NE (rivalry) | L 7–17 | 35,102 | |
| October 15 | No. 6 Missouri | Memorial Stadium; Manhattan, KS | L 0–45 | 10,000 | |
| October 22 | at Oklahoma | Oklahoma Memorial Stadium; Norman, OK | L 7–49 | 44,677 | |
| October 29 | at No. 6 Minnesota* | Memorial Stadium; Minneapolis, MN | L 7–48 | 43,568 | |
| November 5 | Oklahoma State^{†} | Memorial Stadium; Manhattan, KS | L 7–28 | 9,000 | |
| November 12 | Iowa State | Memorial Stadium; Manhattan, KS (rivalry) | L 7–20 | 7,649 | |
| November 19 | at Arizona* | Arizona Stadium; Tucson, AZ | L 16–35 | 21,000–25,793 | |
*Non-conference game; ^{†}Homecoming; Rankings from AP Poll released prior to the game; Source:
