= Charles E. MacMillin =

Arizona politician

Charles E. MacMillan
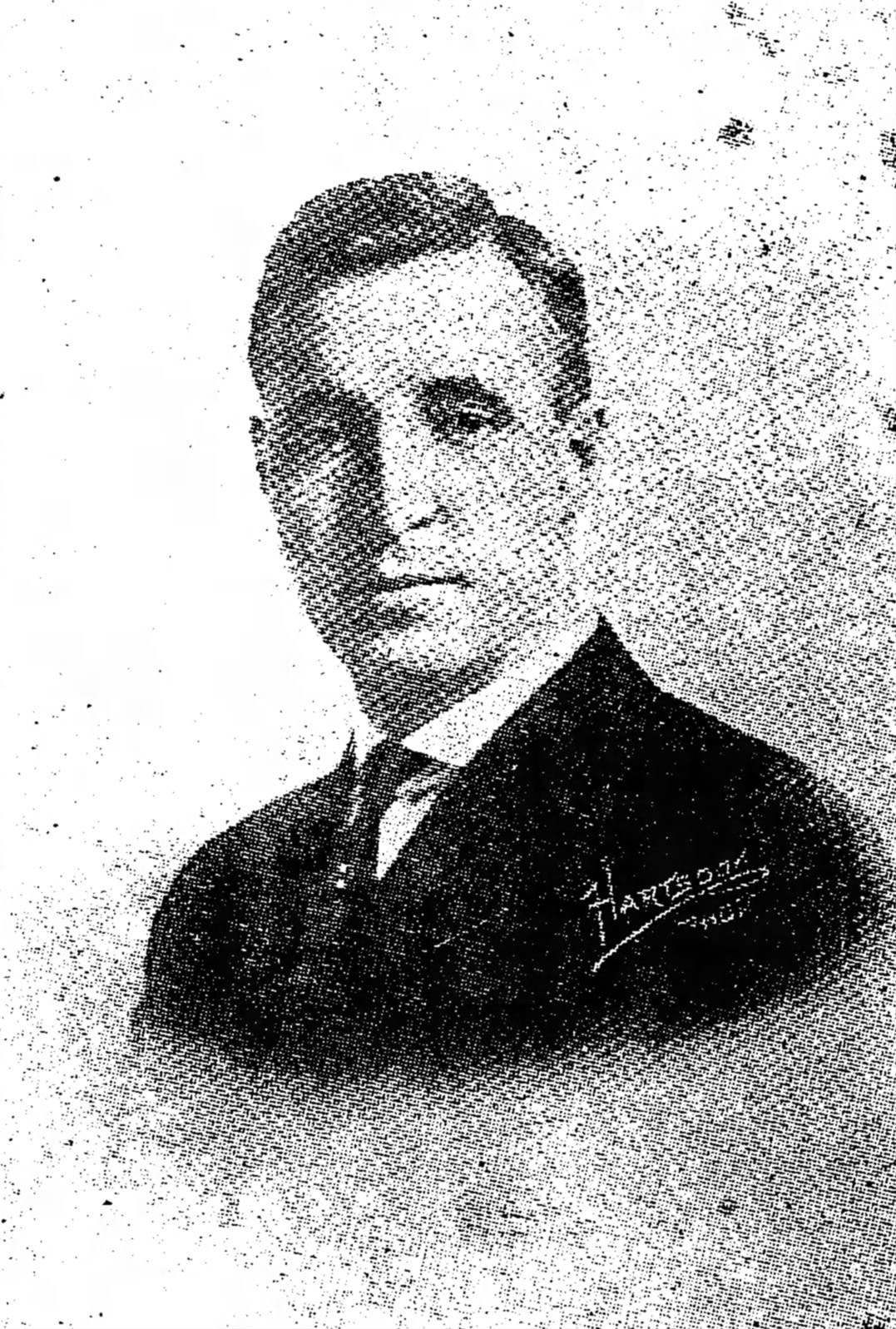
- MacMillin ca. 1922

Member of the Arizona House of Representatives from the Apache County
- In office January 1925 – January 1927
- Preceded by: A. T. Kilcrease; I. D. Rickerson
- Succeeded by: Fred A. Griffin; Charles F. Studley, Jr

Member of the Arizona Senate from the Pinal County district
- In office January 1915 – January 1917
- Preceded by: J. F. Brown
- Succeeded by: John C. Devine

Member of the Arizona Senate from the Pinal County district
- In office January 1921 – January 1925
- Preceded by: John C. Devine
- Succeeded by: A. T. Kilcrease

Personal details
- Born: 1888 Iowa
- Died: March 2, 1941 (aged 52–53) Los Angeles, California
- Party: Democratic
- Profession: Politician

Charles E. MacMillin (1888–1941) was an Arizona politician who served several terms in the Arizona State Senate and House of Representatives. He served three terms in the upper house, two consecutively, and a single term in the lower house, during which he was elected Speaker. He served in the U. S. Army during World War I, and saw action in Europe. Initially a pharmacist by trade, he later turned to insurance. As a result of his insurance business, he was convicted of forgery in 1934 and was sentenced to one to three years in state prison.

== Life and career ==
MacMillin was born in Iowa, and graduated from Iowa State University. He moved to Ray, Arizona in the 1900s, where he worked as a pharmacist in the mining camp.

In 1914, he was elected to the Arizona State Senate, as the lone senator from Pinal County. At the time of his first term in office in 1915, MacMillin was the youngest person to ever serve as an Arizona State Senator, being 26. He ran for re-election in 1916, but lost in the Democrat's primary to John C. Devine, 719–427.

With the U. S. entrance into World War I, MacMillin joined the army and was a sergeant in the 89th Field Artillery. After his return from military service, in 1920 he once again ran for the State Senate and won. He successfully ran for re-election to the State Senate in 1922. In 1924, he once again ran for office, but not for re-election. Instead, MacMillin ran for the state House of Representatives. He won, and when the legislature convened in January 1925, he was elected Speaker of the House. He did not run for re-election in 1926.

In 1927, MacMillin incorporated his own insurance agency, The MacMillin Insurance and Bond Agency. 1934 saw MacMillin run afoul of the law. First, he faced a liquor charge on avoiding Internal Revenue Service taxes. MacMillin pleaded guilty in June, and was fined $500. In May, as the liquor case was proceeding, another investigation involving MacMillin was opened. It had to do with MacMillin cancelling an insurance policy taken out by the state highway department. When fire destroyed several government buildings covered by the policy, MacMillin supposedly cancelled the policy before a claim could be made. In June he was indicted on forgery charges claiming that he forged the name of the secretary of the highway department on a lost policy form. As his trial began in July, just after the jury was selected, MacMillin pleaded guilty to the charge. He was sentenced to one to three years at the state prison in Florence. MacMillin died on March 2, 1941, at the Veteran's Hospital in Los Angeles, California, after five months in the hospital. He was interred in the Veteran's Cemetery there.
