= Journal of Neurology, Neurosurgery and Psychiatry =

- Language: English
- Edited by: Karen Furie

Publication details
- Former names: Journal of Neurology and Psychopathology; Journal of Neurology and Psychiatry
- History: 1920-present
- Publisher: BMJ Group
- Frequency: Monthly
- Impact factor: 7.7 (2025)

Standard abbreviations
- ISO 4: J. Neurol. Neurosurg. Psychiatry

Indexing
- ISSN: 0022-3050 (print); 1468-330X (web)

Links
- Journal homepage

The Journal of Neurology, Neurosurgery and Psychiatry is a monthly peer-reviewed medical journal published by the BMJ Group. It covers research and reviews in the fields of neurology, neurosurgery, and psychiatry. Its editor-in-chief is Karen L. Furie (Brown University).

== History ==
The journal was established in 1920 by Samuel Alexander Kinnier Wilson as the Journal of Neurology and Psychopathology. Wilson was the head of a nine-member editorial committee which, besides Wilson, consisted of Thomas Graham Brown, Carey Coombs, Henry Devine, Bernard Hart, Maurice Nicoll, Charles Stanford Read, Roy Mackenzie Stewart, and Charles Symonds. The journal was renamed Journal of Neurology and Psychiatry from 1938 to 1944, and then obtained its current title.

== Abstracting and indexing ==
The journal is abstracted and indexed in various databases, for example, in: Science Citation Index Expanded, BIOSIS Previews, Index Medicus/MEDLINE/PubMed, Current Contents, Scopus, Embase, and CINAHL. According to the Journal Citation Reports, the journal has a 2024 impact factor of 7.8.
