= A. T. Kilcrease =

American politician

Member of the Arizona Senate from the Pinal County district
- In office January 1925 – December 1926
- Preceded by: Charles E. MacMillin
- Succeeded by: Thomas N. Wills

Member of the Arizona House of Representatives from the Pinal County district
- In office January 1923 – December 1924

Personal details
- Born: August 21, 1879 Crenshaw County, Alabama
- Died: May 2, 1946 (aged 66)
- Party: Democratic
- Spouse: Minnie Longley
- Children: Victor, Dallas, Thomas E., and Juanita
- Profession: Politician

Andrew Thomas Kilcrease (1879–1946) was an American politician from Arizona. He served a single term in the Arizona State Senate during the 7th Arizona State Legislature, holding the seat from Pinal County, after having served in Arizona's lower house during the previous session. He had a background in education, and served at different times as Casa Grande's city clerk and postmaster.

== Biography ==
Kilcrease was born on August 21, 1879, in Crenshaw County, Alabama. He was hired to become principal of the Central School in Casa Grande, Arizona in 1917. He was moving from Bowie, Texas, and was late in arriving, delaying the opening of school by one week, before an acting principal was named until his arrival. He married Minnie Longley of Archer City, Texas on May 26, 1901. The couple had three sons, Victor, Dallas, and Thomas E., and one daughter, Juanita. In 1919 he resigned as principal of the school, and was appointed the city clerk for Casa Grande.

In 1922 he ran unopposed in the primary for one of the two seats to the Arizona House of Representatives in Pinal County. He defeated Republican A. V. Read in November's general election. In 1924 he ran unopposed in the Democrat primary for the single seat from Pinal County for the Arizona State Senate, and defeated Republican George Hall in the general election in November. He did not run for re-election in 1926.

He owned and operated the Casa Grande Steam Laundry for years, and became the Casa Grande postmaster in 1933, serving until 1938. Kilcrease moved to Iowa Park, Texas in 1938, where they had a small ranch, before moving back to Casa Grande in 1941, where they remained the rest of their lives. Kilcrease died on May 2, 1946, in Casa Grande, Arizona, after a long illness.
