= John C. Devine =

American politician from Arizona

Member of the Arizona Senate from the Pinal County district
- In office January 1917 – December 1920
- Preceded by: Charles E. MacMillin
- Succeeded by: Charles E. MacMillin

Personal details
- Born: February 29, 1876 Florence, Arizona
- Died: March 21, 1940 (aged 64) Tucson, Arizona
- Party: Democratic
- Spouse: Grace E. Adcock (1905–1940, his death)
- Children: Milford, John, Eugene, Charles, and Virginia
- Education: St. Mary's College
- Profession: Politician

John Centennial Devine (1876–1940) was an Arizona politician who served two consecutive terms in the Arizona State Senate from 1917 through 1920. An Arizona pioneer, with a mining engineer background, he worked at several mines in Pinal County as either the supervisor or general manager. He worked as an undersheriff both early and late in his career, once killing a man who resisted arrest.

== Biography ==
John C. Devine was born on February 29, 1876, in Florence, Arizona Territory. He attended Florence schools, and then went to St. Mary's College in Oakland, California from 1892 to 1894, where he studied mining and civil engineering. He was a charter member of the Arizona Pioneer Society. Devine was a mining engineer. He was the foreman of the Troy Arizona Copper Company from 1901 to 1906.

Devine married Grace E. Adcock of Marysville, Missouri in 1905 in Los Angeles. The couple had five children: four sons, Milford, John, Eugene, and Charles; and one daughter, Virginia. They had another child, who died in infancy in November 1912. In the early 1900s he was deputy sheriff in Florence, and in 1901 he fatally shot a man, Robert Hatfield, who was resisting arrest for spousal abuse. Hatfield was part of the notorious Hatfield clan. In 1906 he became the superintendent of the Ray Consolidated Copper Company.

He resigned from Ray Consolidated in 1916, in order to take over as president of the Pinal Development Company. In August 1916 Devine challenged the incumbent Democrat, Charles E. MacMillin, in the primary for state senator from Pinal County, who he soundly defeated 719 to 427. He defeated the Republican candidate, Frank H. Swenson, in the November general election.

At some point, he became general manager of the White Metal Company, which he managed until 1926. He was a Mason, and attained the 32nd Degree. He ran for, and won, re-election in 1918. Devine moved to Tucson in 1922, in order for his children to attend school. He served as jailer under Sheriff John F. Belton, being appointed in 1933. He remained in the post until he unexpectedly resigned in August 1936. In 1936 he was appointed undersheriff by Sheriff Ed F. Echols, which took effect in January 1937 Devine died on March 21, 1940. He had been ill for approximately one year, although he continued to work in his county undersheriff duties right up until his death.
