= 1960 Missouri Tigers football team =

American college football season

1960 Missouri Tigers football

National champion (Poling System) Big 8 champion Orange Bowl champion

Orange Bowl, W 21–14 vs Navy
- Conference: Big Eight Conference

Ranking
- Coaches: No. 4
- AP: No. 5
- Record: 11–0 (7–0 Big 8)
- Head coach: Dan Devine (3rd season)
- Home stadium: Memorial Stadium

1960 Big Eight Conference football standings
	Conf.					Overall
Team	W		L		T	W		L		T
No. 5 Missouri $	7	–	0	–	0	11	–	0	–	0
No. 11 Kansas†	6	–	0	–	1	7	–	2	–	1
Colorado	6	–	1	–	0	7	–	3	–	0
Iowa State	4	–	3	–	0	7	–	3	–	0
Oklahoma	2	–	4	–	1	3	–	6	–	1
Nebraska	2	–	5	–	0	4	–	6	–	0
Oklahoma State	2	–	5	–	0	3	–	7	–	0
Kansas State	0	–	7	–	0	1	–	9	–	0
$ – Conference champion; † Kansas' conference victories against Colorado and Missouri were forfeited by Big Eight sanctions, though both are recognized as Kansas victories by Kansas and the NCAA.; Rankings from AP Poll

The 1960 Missouri Tigers football team was an American football team that represented the University of Missouri in the Big Eight Conference (Big 8) during the 1960 college football season. The team compiled an 11–0 record (7–0 against Big 8 opponents), won the Big 8 championship, defeated Navy in the Orange Bowl, was ranked No. 5 in the final AP poll, and outscored its opponents 295 to 93. Led by third-year head coach Dan Devine, the team played its home games at Memorial Stadium in Columbia, Missouri.

The 1960 season included one of the most famous games in the history of Missouri vs. Kansas rivalry. Missouri had won its first nine games and was ranked atop the polls, but the visiting Jayhawks won 23–7. Kansas used an ineligible player, Bert Coan, in the game and the win was officially awarded to Missouri by the Big Eight Conference on December 8. The reversal brought Missouri's record to 11–0 instead of 10–1.

The team's statistical leaders included Mel West with 650 rushing yards and 650 yards of total offense, Ron Taylor with 302 passing yards, Danny LaRose with 151 receiving yards, and Donnie Smith with 78 point scored.

The team was featured in the 2024 historical novel "Respectable Roughnecks" by Brendon Steenbergen. The book focused on Dan LaRose during his All-American season, and on West and Norris Stevenson with their struggles as Missouri's first black players.

On August 6, 2026, Eric Schmitt (junior Senator of Missouri) introduced a resolution (S.Res. 833) recognizing the 1960 Missouri football team as having a claim to the national championship. The resolution passed with no objections, but had no force of laws and was said to reflect the Senate's "sentiments." Later that same year, the University announced it was recognizing the championship as part of the Memorial Stadium centennial celebrations.

== Schedule ==
Date	Opponent	Rank	Site	Result	Attendance	Source
September 17	SMU*		Memorial Stadium; Columbia, MO	W 20–0	26,500	
September 24	Oklahoma State	No. 16	Memorial Stadium; Columbia, MO	W 28–7	26,000	
October 1	at No. 20 Penn State*	No. 19	Beaver Stadium; University Park, PA	W 21–8	35,500	
October 8	at Air Force*	No. 11	DU Stadium; Denver, CO	W 34–8	24,398	
October 15	at Kansas State	No. 6	Memorial Stadium; Manhattan, KS	W 45–0	10,000	
October 22	Iowa State	No. 5	Memorial Stadium; Columbia, MO (rivalry)	W 34–8	33,683	
October 29	at Nebraska	No. 5	Memorial Stadium; Lincoln, NE (rivalry)	W 28–0	34,581	
November 5	No. 18 Colorado	No. 2	Memorial Stadium; Columbia, MO	W 16–6	37,500	
November 12	at Oklahoma	No. 2	Oklahoma Memorial Stadium; Norman, OK (rivalry)	W 41–19	53,369	
November 19	Kansas^{†}	No. 1	Memorial Stadium; Columbia, MO (Border War)	W 7–23^{Δ}	43,000	
January 2	vs. No. 4 Navy*	No. 5	Miami Orange Bowl; Miami, FL (Orange Bowl)	W 21–14	71,218	
*Non-conference game; ^{†}Homecoming; ^{Δ} (Kansas forfeited); Rankings from AP Poll released prior to the game; Source:
