= Michael Devine =

Michael or Mickey Devine may refer to:

- Michael Devine (hunger striker) (1954–1981), INLA hunger striker who died in 1981
- Michael Devine (footballer) (born 1973), Irish footballer
- Mickey Devine (baseball) (1892–1937), baseball player from the early 20th century
