= 1837 Grand Liverpool Steeplechase =

- Grand Liverpool Steeplechase
- Location: Aintree
- Date: 1 March 1837
- Winning horse: The Duke
- Jockey: Henry Potts
- Owner: Mr. T Chawner

The 1837 Grand Liverpool Steeplechase was the second of three unofficial annual precursors of a Handicap Steeple-chase, later to become known as the Grand National Steeplechase horse race which took place at Aintree Racecourse near Liverpool on 4 March 1837 and attracted a field of four runners. This race did not carry the prestige of the future Grand Nationals and its status as an official Grand National was revoked some time between 1862 and 1873.

== Competitors and betting ==
Four horses lined up for the start of the race for which starting prices were recorded by the Liverpool Mail. The competitors were:

- Dan O'Connell, [sometimes listed as Daniel O'Connell] a 6-year-old ridden by Mr J Knaresborough. 5/4 Favourite
- The Disowned, a 6-year-old ridden by Alan McDonough. 3/1
- The Duke, the 8-year-old winner of the 1836 Great Liverpool Steeplechase, ridden by Henry Potts. 6/1
- Zanga, a 7-year-old ridden by John Devine, the only rider to have competed in the race the previous year. 12/1
- Polyanthus Non Runner
- Bilk Non Runner
- Seagull Non Runner

== The race ==
The Duke refused at the first fence, jumping into the lane but not jumping out, and had to be put at the fence again. He continued some way behind his three rivals. Dan O'Connell Zanga and The Disowned all then refused at the 3rd obstacle, known as the Trial fence and had to be put at the fence several times. The Duke came to, and cleared, the same fence at the second attempt, continuing on to secure a long lead. The Disowned and Zanga eventually cleared the fence while Dan O'Connell took a legal, but longer route around the fence. Zanga unseated his rider at the next fence and wasn't put back into the race once recovered. Victory for The Duke was certain, barring a fall once the Trial fence was cleared for the second time and he was slowed to a mere trot long before passing the finishing post. The Disowned came home alone in second, having reduced the lead to twelve lengths, while Dan O'Connell was listed as distanced, meaning he was too far behind the second horse to be considered a credible third. Zanga was instead entered into a later race on the card, which he won.

== Finishing order ==
Position	Horse	Jockey	Age	Weight	SP	Distance
01	The Duke	Henry Potts	8	12-00	6/1	12 lengths {refused to jump out of the lane {1st fence} and the trail {3rd fence} went on both times}
02	The Disowned	Allen McDonough	6	12-00	3/1	A distance {over 30 lengths} {Refused the Trial {3rd} fence multiple times before continuing}
03	Dan O'Connell	J Knaresborough	6	12-00	4/5F	Last to finish {Refused the Trial {3rd] fence multiple times before continuing. Some records regard him as a non finisher due to the distance to the second horse}

== Non-finishers ==
Fence	Horse	Jockey	Age	Weight	SP	Fate
04	Zanga	John Devine	7	12-00	12/1	Refused the Trial {3rd} fence multiple times before continuing, Unseated Rider at the next fence}

The race was won in a time of fourteen minutes, beating the previous year's time by five minutes and fifty seconds.

== Aftermath ==
The race would go on to be regarded as the second running of the Grand National until the mid-1860s when newspapers began omitting the race, and those of 1836 and 1838, from the records of previous winners. This in turn led to a popular, but incorrect, belief that the race was run over a course at Maghull and not Aintree, and became the official view held by Aintree when a board listing the winners of all previous Nationals was erected underneath the stands in 1894, stating that the races of 1837, and 1838 were run at Maghull. Although it is now widely acknowledged that the race was indeed run at Aintree, it is also the official view of Aintree that the races prior to 1839 should not be included as legitimate Grand Nationals and should be regarded more as precursors. As a result, The Duke is not listed in official publications as a dual winner of the race.
