= Ó Daimhín =

Irish surname meaning ox or stag

Ó Daimhín or Ní Dhaimhín is one of several surnames derived from the Irish Gaelic that are now rendered in English as Devine. The root of this name is "damh", which according to Dineen means an "ox or a Stag". It is also used figuratively as "hero". Confusingly, scholars in the 19th and early 20th centuries sometimes thought it was derived from "dámh", meaning a bard or poet but this is no longer accepted. Older Irish forms of the name were written as Ua Daimhín and Ua Daimhín.

According to Edward MacLysaght,

The name Devine is chiefly found to-day in the counties of Tyrone and Londonderry but is now rare in Fermanagh. Up to the fifteenth century the chief of this sept was Lord of Tirkennedy in Co. Fermanagh. Though the etymology of the name has been questioned, we may accept the view of so eminent a scholar as O’Donovan that it is in Irish Ó Daimhín.

Other names that may derive from Ó Daimhín or similar-sounding Irish names are: O'Devine, Devane, Davin, Devin, Divin, Divine, Diven, Devan and Dwayne.

== See also ==
- City of Devine, Texas: named after Judge Thomas Jefferson Devine.
