= 1960 Oklahoma Sooners football team =

American college football season

1960 Oklahoma Sooners football
- Conference: Big Eight Conference
- Record: 3–6–1 (2–4–1 Big 8)
- Head coach: Bud Wilkinson (14th season)
- Captains: Ron Hartline; Marshall York
- Home stadium: Oklahoma Memorial Stadium

1960 Big Eight Conference football standings
	Conf.					Overall
Team	W		L		T	W		L		T
No. 5 Missouri $	7	–	0	–	0	11	–	0	–	0
No. 11 Kansas†	6	–	0	–	1	7	–	2	–	1
Colorado	6	–	1	–	0	7	–	3	–	0
Iowa State	4	–	3	–	0	7	–	3	–	0
Oklahoma	2	–	4	–	1	3	–	6	–	1
Nebraska	2	–	5	–	0	4	–	6	–	0
Oklahoma State	2	–	5	–	0	3	–	7	–	0
Kansas State	0	–	7	–	0	1	–	9	–	0
$ – Conference champion; † Kansas' conference victories against Colorado and Missouri were forfeited by Big Eight sanctions, though both are recognized as Kansas victories by Kansas and the NCAA.; Rankings from AP Poll

The 1960 Oklahoma Sooners football team represented the University of Oklahoma during the 1960 college football season. They played their home games at Oklahoma Memorial Stadium and competed as members of the Big Eight Conference. They were coached by head coach Bud Wilkinson.

== Schedule ==
Date	Opponent	Site	Result	Attendance	Source
September 27	No. 14 Northwestern*	Oklahoma Memorial Stadium; Norman, OK	L 3–19	61,289	
October 1	Pittsburgh*	Oklahoma Memorial Stadium; Norman, OK	W 15–14	48,835	
October 8	vs. No. 15 Texas*	Cotton Bowl; Dallas, TX (Red River Shootout)	L 0–24	76,059	
October 15	at No. 9 Kansas	Memorial Stadium; Lawrence, KS	T 13–13	39,593	
October 22	Kansas State	Oklahoma Memorial Stadium; Norman, OK	W 49–7	44,677	
October 29	at Colorado	Folsom Field; Boulder, CO	L 0–7	45,281	
November 5	at Iowa State	Clyde Williams Field; Ames, IA	L 6–10	15,451	
November 12	No. 2 Missouri	Oklahoma Memorial Stadium; Norman, OK (rivalry)	L 19–41	53,369	
November 19	Nebraska	Oklahoma Memorial Stadium; Norman, OK (rivalry)	L 14–17	42,701	
November 26	at Oklahoma State	Lewis Field; Stillwater, OK (Bedlam Series)	W 17–6	32,381	
*Non-conference game; Rankings from AP Poll released prior to the game; Source:

== Rankings ==
Ranking movements Legend: ██ Increase in ranking ██ Decrease in ranking — = Not ranked
	Week											
Poll	Pre	1	2	3	4	5	6	7	8	9	10	Final
AP	10	—	—	—	—	—	—	—	—	—	—	—

== NFL draft ==
The following players were drafted into the National Football League following the season.

Round	Pick	Player	Position	NFL team
4	51	Ron Hartline	Running back	Detroit Lions
6	80	Mike McClellan	Back	San Francisco 49ers
14	159	Phil Loman	Center	Cleveland Browns
