= Henry Devine =

- Born: 2 May 1879; Bristol
- Died: 1 May 1940 (aged 60); Portsmouth
- Occupation: Psychiatrist

Henry Devine OBE FRCP (2 May 1879 – May 1, 1940) was a British physician and psychiatrist.

After education at Merchant Venturers' School, Henry Devine studied medicine at University College, Bristol and at Bristol General Hospital, qualifying for MB in 1902. After serving as a house physician at Bristol General Hospital, he studied medicine at King's College, London, where he received the degree MB BS (Lond.) in 1905. After a postgraduate educational visit to Kraepelin's clinic in Munich, he successively held junior appointments in England at London's Mount Vernon Hospital for Consumption, at Wakefield's West Riding Pauper Lunatic Asylum, and at South West London's Chelsea Hospital for Women. He then entered the London County Council's mental hospital service. After briefly serving at Cane Hill Asylum, he was appointed in 1907 as an assistant medical officer at Epsom's Long Grove Asylum.

Devine joined 1905 the Association of Medical Officers of Asylums and Hospitals for the Insane and was awarded in 1909 the Association's Gaskell prize (£45) and gold medal. In July 1909 he was awarded the MD degree of the University of London in the division of psychiatry.

From Long Grove Asylum he went as senior medical officer to the West Riding Pauper Lunatic Asylum and then became medical superintendent of the Portsmouth Mental Hospital (in 1937 renamed St. James' Hospital). Devine was in command there during WWI and for his wartime services he was made OBE in 1919. He was appointed consulting physician to the Royal Victoria Hospital, Netley. In 1919 he was elected FRCP.

In 1920 Devine was a member of the editorial committee of the newly founded Journal of Neurology and Psychopathology. On the editorial staff of the Journal of Mental Science he was an assistant editor from 1916 to 1920 and a co-editor from 1920 to 1927. In 1929 he published a volume on Recent Advances in Psychiatry.

Devine’s final post was that of medical superintendent of the Holloway Sanatorium, near Virginia Water, Surrey, where he worked through the decade of the 1930s until his retirement in 1938, due to ill health.

At the Holloway Sanatorium, which was built for the "middle-class insane", Devine experimented with thyroid shock treatment, a precursor of insulin shock therapy.

... Devine had a particular interest in using glandular agents not only for their physiological effects in supplying what the organism lacks, but also as "shock agents" with a view to the modification of the humoral-neurovegetative tonus.

Upon his death in 1940 he was survived by his wife Phyllis née Hanson and two sons.

== Selected publications ==
- Devine, Henry (1911). "The pathogenesis of a delusion". Journal of Mental Science. 57 (238): 458–474. doi:10.1192/bjp.57.238.458.
- Devine, Henry (1921). "A study of hallucinations in a case of schizophrenia". Journal of Mental Science. 67 (277): 172–186. doi:10.1192/bjp.67.277.172.
- Recent advances in psychiatry (2nd ed.). 1933.
