= 1960 Navy Midshipmen football team =

American college football season

1960 Navy Midshipmen football

Eastern co-champion

Orange Bowl, L 21–14 vs. Missouri
- Conference: Independent

Ranking
- Coaches: No. 6
- AP: No. 4
- Record: 9–2
- Head coach: Wayne Hardin (2nd season)
- Captain: Joe Matalavage
- Home stadium: Navy–Marine Corps Memorial Stadium

1960 Southern major college football independents records
	Conf.			Overall
Team	W	L	T	W		L		T
No. 4 Navy		–		9	–	2	–	0
Memphis State		–		8	–	2	–	0
Houston		–		6	–	4	–	0
Miami (FL)		–		6	–	4	–	0
Florida State		–		3	–	6	–	1
Rankings from AP poll

The 1960 Navy Midshipmen football team represented the United States Naval Academy as an independent in the 1960 college football season. The offense scored 262 points while the defense allowed 103 points. Led by head coach Wayne Hardin, the Midshipmen finished the season with nine wins and an appearance in the Orange Bowl.

The Midshipmen were Lambert Trophy co-champions with undefeated Yale. Senior halfback Joe Bellino was awarded the Heisman Trophy and the Maxwell Award.

Navy upset third-ranked Washington in Seattle, which vaulted them up eleven places in the rankings, to sixth. They played Air Force for the first time this season, a 35–3 win in mid-October in Baltimore as Bellino scored three touchdowns and made an interception, all in the first half.

== Schedule ==
Date	Opponent	Rank	Site	Result	Attendance	Source
September 17	at Boston College		Alumni Stadium; Chestnut Hill, MA	W 22–7	27,000	
September 24	Villanova^{†}		Navy–Marine Corps Memorial Stadium; Annapolis, MD	W 41–7	20,271	
October 1	at No. 3 Washington	No. 17	Husky Stadium; Seattle, WA	W 15–14	57,379	
October 8	vs. SMU	No. 6	Foreman Field; Norfolk, VA (Oyster Bowl)	W 26–7	30,000	
October 15	Air Force	No. 5	Memorial Stadium; Baltimore, MD (rivalry)	W 35–3	50,000	
October 22	at Penn	No. 4	Franklin Field; Philadelphia, PA	W 27–0	26,123	
October 29	vs. Notre Dame	No. 4	Philadelphia Municipal Stadium; Philadelphia, PA (rivalry)	W 14–7	63,000	
November 5	at No. 15 Duke	No. 4	Duke Stadium; Durham, NC	L 10–19	46,000	
November 12	Virginia	No. 8	Navy–Marine Corps Memorial Stadium; Annapolis, MD	W 41–6	20,208	
November 26	vs. Army	No. 7	Philadelphia Municipal Stadium; Philadelphia, PA (Army–Navy Game)	W 17–12	100,000	
January 2, 1961	vs. No. 5 Missouri	No. 4	Miami Orange Bowl; Miami, FL (Orange Bowl)	L 14–21	71,218	
^{†}Homecoming; Rankings from AP Poll released prior to the game; Source:

== Roster ==
1960 Navy Midshipmen football team roster
Players			Coaches
Offense: Pos. / # / Name / Class; HB / / Joe Bellino / Sr	Defense: Pos. / # / Name / Class	Special teams: Pos. / # / Name / Class	Head coach: Wayne Hardin; Coordinators/assistant coaches Legend: (C) Team captain; (S) Suspended; (I) Ineligible; Injured; Redshirt

== Awards and honors ==
- Joe Bellino – Heisman Trophy, Maxwell Award

== 1961 NFL draft ==
Player	Position	Round	Pick	NFL club
Joe Bellino	Halfback	17	227	Washington Redksins
