= Martin Becher =

English soldier and steeplechase jockey

- Born: 1797; Norfolk
- Died: October 12, 1864 (aged 66–67)
- Occupation: Jockey
- Spouse: Susan Dobree

Martin William Becher (1797 – 12 October 1864) was a former soldier and steeplechase jockey in whose memory the Becher's Brook obstacle at Aintree Racecourse is named.

== Military career ==
Becher first served in the military during the Napoleonic Wars and was stationed in Belgium at the time of the Battle of Waterloo, though historical claims that he saw active service in the battle are thought to be without foundation.

== Racing career ==
Upon being released from service, Becher took a commission as a captain in the Buckinghamshire Yeomanry, but the few demands placed upon him within this role allowed him a great deal of time to pursue his passion of cross-country riding.

During his riding career, Becher won almost every race of note during the 1820s and 1830s including the Aylesbury Chase, Cheltenham Steeplechase, Leamington Chase and Great St Albans. It was the last of these races that inspired him to put the idea of a great cross-country chase to racecourse owner and friend William Lynn. Becher was a regular visitor to Liverpool and Lynn's racecourse at Aintree, famously winning there with the horse with which the public most readily associated him, Vivian.

On one occasion the pair discussed a 'Great Chase of the North' with the result that Lynn staged the Grand Liverpool Steeplechase in 1836. Fittingly, Becher not only took part but won the race upon a local horse, The Duke, in the lilac and white colours of Mr. Sirdefield.

The event would go on to become known as the Grand National, although Becher's victory in 1836 was disregarded by future generations as merely a precursor to the first official running in 1839.

Becher was already considering retirement from race riding at the age of forty before lining up for this event on Conrad, and setting off at the head of the field. Upon reaching the first major obstacle on the course, the first of two brooks, Conrad dug his heels in, hurling Becher over his head and into the brook beyond. Becher lay in the water until his rivals had all thundered over the brook, before climbing out thoroughly soaked and cursing how he hadn't realised how filthy water tasted without the benefits of whisky. He remounted and set off in pursuit, only to be parted from his mount again at the second brook. Becher never again took part in the event but his name was given to the first brook (the sixth and twenty-second fence in the modern National) and has ensured his eternal fame.

In 1838, he retired from racing after coming second in a race at Daventry.

== Personal life ==
Becher was the son of William Becher and Harriet Martina Thompson. He married Susan Dobree on 14 August 1825 at St. Marylebone, London, and they had two sons, Martin John King Becher and Dr. George Tobin Dashwood Becher.

Upon retirement from racing, Becher briefly fell on hard financial times. He was briefly employed by the Great Northern Railway but in 1842 he ending up in a debtors' prison when owing a Mr Williams £500 However he recovered and his wife inherited a small property. He lived his last years in comfortable affluence, remaining a popular and recognised figure in racing until shortly before his death. He was buried at Willesdon Cemetery in London.

Becher was a very popular conversationalist and story-teller and was famed for his party trick of leaping onto a mantelpiece from a standing jump.
