= 1961 Orange Bowl =

American college football game

- 27th Orange Bowl
- The Miami Orange Bowl in Miami, Florida, hosted the Orange Bowl.
Missouri Tigers	Navy Midshipmen
(10–0)	(9–1)
Big Eight	Independent
21	14
Head coach: Dan Devine	Head coach: Wayne Hardin
AP / Coaches; 5 / 4	AP / Coaches; 4 / 6
	1	2	3	4	Total
Missouri	7	7	0	7	21
Navy	6	0	0	8	14
- Date: January 2, 1961
- Season: 1960
- Stadium: Orange Bowl
- Location: Miami, Florida
- Favorite: Missouri by 6½ points
- Referee: W. P. Astle (Big Eight; split crew: Big Eight, EAIFO)
- Attendance: 72,212

United States TV coverage
- Network: CBS
- Announcers: Ray Scott, Paul Christman

The 1961 Orange Bowl was the 27th edition of the college football bowl game, played at the Miami Orange Bowl in Miami, on Monday, January 2. Part of the 1960–61 bowl game season, the No. 5 Missouri Tigers of the Big Eight Conference defeated the No. 4 Navy Midshipmen, 21–14.

New Year's Day was on a Sunday in 1961; the college bowl games were played the following day.

== Teams ==
=== Missouri ===
Missouri won its first nine games; they lost to visiting Kansas, but the Jayhawks used an ineligible player and later forfeited.

=== Navy ===
Navy's only loss was in early November at Duke; the Blue Devils went on to win the Cotton Bowl. Senior halfback Joe Bellino won the Heisman Trophy.

== Game summary ==
The game kicked off at 1 pm.

Navy jumped to a 6–0 lead with a 98-yard fumble return for a touchdown. But Missouri answered when Norm Beal intercepted Navy's Hal Spooner, rumbling down the sideline for a 90-yard return, giving Missouri a 7–6 advantage. They then drove 80 yards for a second touchdown, and led 14–6 at halftime.

Missouri's defense shut down the Midshipmen's running game, including Heisman Trophy winner Joe Bellino, forcing Navy to pass. But Missouri continued to run the ball, grinding it out for 223 rushing yards. After a scoreless third quarter, Missouri drove down 64 yards and capitalized with a 1-yard run from quarterback Ronnie Taylor. Taylor, who went 1 for 6 passing, threw for only five total yards. Down 21–6, Bellino caught a 27-yard pass from Spooner, and then made the two-point conversion, cutting the lead to 21–14. Missouri held on for the win. President-elect John F. Kennedy attended the game.

== Aftermath ==
Missouri's next major bowl appearance was after the 1965 season, a win in the Sugar. Their only Orange Bowl since this one was in January 1970.

This remains Navy's only Orange Bowl; their next major bowl appearance is their most recent, the Cotton following the 1963 season.

This was the last telecast of the Orange Bowl by CBS for 35 years.
