= Bert Coan =

American football player (1940–2022)

No. 26, 23, 33
- Position: Halfback

Personal information
- Born: July 2, 1940; Timpson, Texas, U.S.
- Died: February 19, 2022 (aged 81); Garrison, Texas, U.S.
- Listed height: 6 ft 5 in (1.96 m)
- Listed weight: 220 lb (100 kg)

Career information
- High school: Pasadena (Pasadena, Texas)
- College: TCU (1958); Kansas (1959–1961)
- NFL draft: 1962: 7th round, 85th overall pick
- AFL draft: 1962: 14th round, 105th overall pick

Career history
- San Diego Chargers (1962); Kansas City Chiefs (1963–1968)

Awards and highlights
- Super Bowl champion (IV); AFL champion (1966); Second-team All-Big Eight (1960)

Career AFL statistics
- Rushing yards: 1,259
- Rushing average: 4.4
- Receptions: 39
- Receiving yards: 367
- Total touchdowns: 19
- Stats at Pro Football Reference

Elroy Bert Coan III (July 2, 1940 – February 19, 2022) was an American professional football player. He is most notable because of his extraordinary speed (9.4 in the 100-yard dash) and size (6 ft 5 in (1.96 m), 220 lb (100 kg)).

== Career ==
Coan was the central figure in a dispute over the 1960 college football game between the University of Kansas Jayhawks and the University of Missouri Tigers, the second-longest-running rivalry in college football (known as the "Border War").

Coan played for Kansas – and helped the Jayhawks win the 1960 game by a score of 23–7 over Missouri, then-ranked #1. After the Kansas Athletic Department delayed the hearing for over a year, on December 8, 1960 the Big Eight declared Coan ineligible due to a recruiting violation by Bud Adams while Coan was still at Texas Christian University (TCU) and forfeited the game to Missouri—thus erasing Missouri's only loss on the field that year. Missouri counts the 1960 game as a win by forfeit, thus giving it the only undefeated and untied season in school history. The Big Eight also credited the 1960 game to Missouri. However, Kansas (and the NCAA) count the game as a Kansas victory. Ever since, the two universities have disputed the overall win–loss record in the long-running series.

Coan went on to play in 72 games in seven seasons in the American Football League; the first season with the San Diego Chargers, and the rest with the Kansas City Chiefs.

Coan died in Garrison, Texas, on February 19, 2022, at the age of 81.
