= The Duke (horse) =

British racehorse

The Duke was a racehorse that won the first Great Liverpool Steeplechase at Aintree, which would be later renamed the Grand National. His rider was Captain Martin Becher after whom the famous fence Becher's Brook was named. He won the Grand national in 1836 and 1837, and came third in 1838.

His second victory is officially recorded as having taken place over a course at nearby Maghull, although detailed research into the race over recent years has shown that the race was indeed run over the Aintree course.

== See also ==
- List of racehorses
