= 1836 Grand Liverpool Steeplechase =

- Grand Liverpool Steeplechase
- Location: Aintree
- Date: 29 February 1836
- Winning horse: The Duke
- Starting price: 3/1
- Jockey: Captain Martin Becher

The 1836 Grand Liverpool Steeplechase was the first of three unofficial annual precursors of a steeplechase which later became known as the Grand National.

The steeplechase was held at Aintree Racecourse near Liverpool, England on 29 February 1836 and attracted a field of ten runners.

The winning horse was The Duke, ridden by Captain Martin Becher in the violet with white sleeves and cap colours of Mr Sirdefield, the landlord of the George Inn in Great Crosby and was trained privately. The race was won in a time of 15 minutes 12 seconds, over twice the present course record.

The race was a selling race and its status as an official Grand National was revoked some time between 1862 and 1873.

== The Course ==
For many years the course set for this race was thought to be at Maghull, with even the honours board at Aintree stating such. However, contemporary reports state with no doubt that the course was Aintree, and the same, which was used for every other race bar those, which took place at Gatwick during the First World War. The Start was at the same point where most Nationals would commence from the 1860s until the early 21st century, just in front of the stands, facing out towards the line of country the runners would take. There was no set number of created fences and instead the runners had to navigate a course as best they could. What potential obstacles they encountered along the way could be either jumped or navigated around, just as long as they remained outside a set of flags, which marked the inner line of the course. Therefore running around a fence, would not disqualify a horse as it would today. The course had many lanes around it that a rider could take if they felt it more advantageous than jumping the banks from field to field.

The potential obstacles they would encounter if they followed the expected line of country to be run. Fence 1 A formidable bank out of a lane topped with furze, Fence 2 Stiff fence, Fence 3 Stiff fence, Fence 4 Stiff fence, Fence 5 Brook. The course from here back towards the racecourse wasn't described but, from contemporary reports from later years most likely consisted of two banks after the Brook, which after 1839 Grand National became known as Bechers Brook, some form of fence at the farthest point of the course, which would later become known as the extreme turn and later the Canal turn, and then a line of fences along the Canal side, usually around four here. However, there were several lanes and gates a competitor could navigate around the Canal side of the course, avoiding many of these fences.

If they jumped them all then the last fence before entering the race course proper again would be Fence 12 An awkward rail onto a paved road.

The runners then had a half mile to cover to reach Fence 13 Stiff hurdle well matted with furze, Fence 14 Stiff hurdle well matted with furze. They then passed the grandstand and would cover the same ground again.

=== The race ===
The race got off to a poor start when all ten runners refused at the first obstacle, Derry turning and leading the way at the second attempt. Once past that, the field continued around the first circuit without incident, although Gulliver and Cowslip were tailed off and looking distressed when they came back in sight in front of the stands, both being pulled up, rather than take the second circuit.

Only five remained in the contest when the first brook was reached for the second time, Captain Beecher having set a killing pace on The Duke with Laurie Todd, Polyanthus, Cock-A-Hoop and Percy the only others who could stay in touch while Baronet, The Sweep and Derry were all tailed off or out of the race entirely.

Prior to the race it was ordered that one particular gate out of a lane near the paved road would remain nailed open so that the runners could pass. However, one spectator took exception to this and either by design, or just not realising, freed and closed the gate after the first circuit. Horatio Powell, on board the favourite, Laurie Todd took this route on the first circuit and again on the second, not expecting the gate ahead to now be closed. The obstacle proved too high for the favourite to jump and the horse became the first to fall in the race. Powell was quickly on his feet and making a bid to remount when another competitor, Most likely Bretherton aboard Cock-A-Hoop, knocked him back to the ground. While there appears to have been some whispers that this act was deliberate, the fact Powell made no objection after the race suggest he at least believed the collision to have been mere accident. Either way, Laurie Todd backer's had lost their money.

The chances of Cock-A-Hoop and Percy were fading by this stage as they were losing ground on the two leaders and by the time they came in sight of the stands, they were battling for third pace. Both were briefly offered hope as the two leaders, The Duke and Polyanthus both blundered at the final hurdle before going on to dispute the finish. The Duke prevailed by one length with Polyanthus finishing second. The race was completed in fifteen minutes and 12 seconds, taking almost half as long again as the course would be covered in an average future Grand National, suggesting it was either cantered at a very slow pace or the runners encountered more issues than the reporters on course recorded.

== Finishing order ==
Position	Horse	Jockey	Age	Weight	SP	Distance	Colours
Winner	The Duke	Captain Martin Becher		12-00	3/1	15 Mins, 12 Secs	Lilac & White
Second	Polyanthus	Dick Christian		12-00	5/1	1 Length	Yellow
Third	Cock-A-Hoop	Bartholomew Bretherton		12-00	9/1		Orange
Fourth and last	Percy	W. Tempest		12-00	6/1		Crimson and white
Did not finish
Fence 26 Paved Lane	Laurie Todd	Horatio Powell		12-00	2/1 F	Fell	Purple and crimson
Fence 20 Brook	The Baronet	E. Kershaw		12-00	6/1	Tailed off, Pulled up	Yellow & Black Stripe
Fence 20 {Brook}	Derry	John Devine		12-00	8/1	Tailed off, Pulled up	Purple & Crimson
Fence 20 {Brook}	The Sweep	Giles Patrick		12-00	10/1	Tailed off, Pulled up	Salmon
Fence 13	Cowslip	S. Martin		12-00	12/1	Tailed off, Pulled up	Straw
Fence 13 {Hurdle}	Gulliver	J. Denton		12-00	8/1	Tailed off, Pulled up	Yellow & Black Sleeves

=== Aftermath ===
The race largely failed to capture the public imagination and came in for scathing comments from some of the local press. By the time the first Grand National historians began emerging in the early 1860s this race, and the two which would follow in 1837 and 1838, had largely been forgotten by the passing of time and fading memories. As a result, when the first honours board was erected at Aintree in the early 1890s this race was totally omitted and remained forgotten for over a century before being rediscovered early in the 21st century. It is still regarded officially by Aintree as not being worthy of Grand National status and is instead regarded as the first of three unofficial precursors over the same course.
