= Disease in ornamental fish =

Ornamental fish kept in aquariums are susceptible to numerous diseases. Due to their generally small size and the low cost of replacing diseased or dead fish, the cost of testing and treating diseases is often seen as more trouble than the value of the fish.

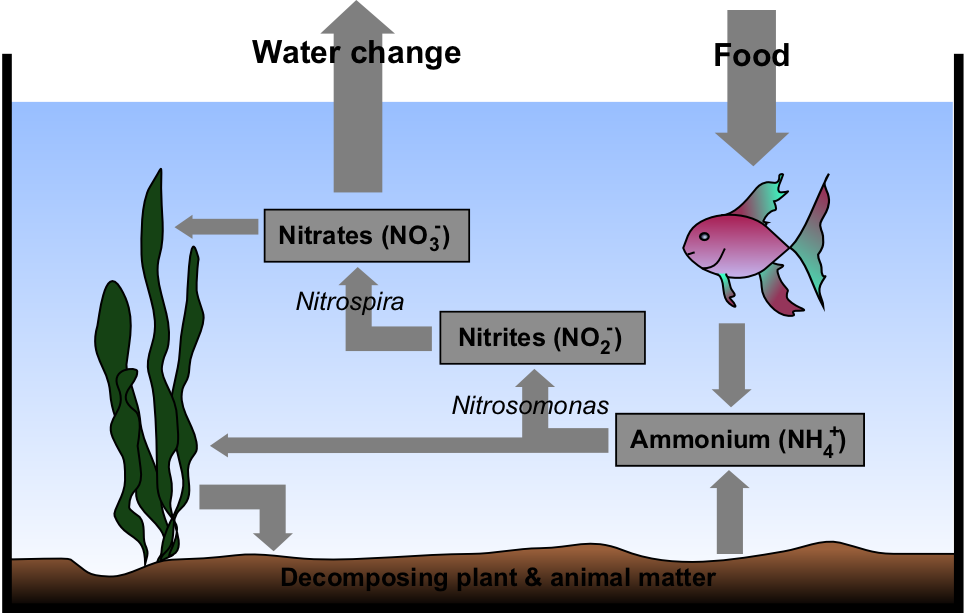
Nitrogen cycle

Due to the artificially limited volume of water and high concentration of fish in most aquarium tanks, communicable diseases often affect most or all fish in a tank. An improper nitrogen cycle, inappropriate aquarium plants and potentially harmful freshwater invertebrates can directly harm or add to the stresses on ornamental fish in a tank. Despite this, many diseases in captive fish can be avoided or prevented through proper water conditions and a well-adjusted ecosystem within the tank.

== Causes ==
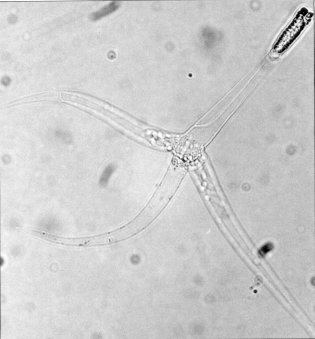
Myxobolus cerebralis triactinomyxon

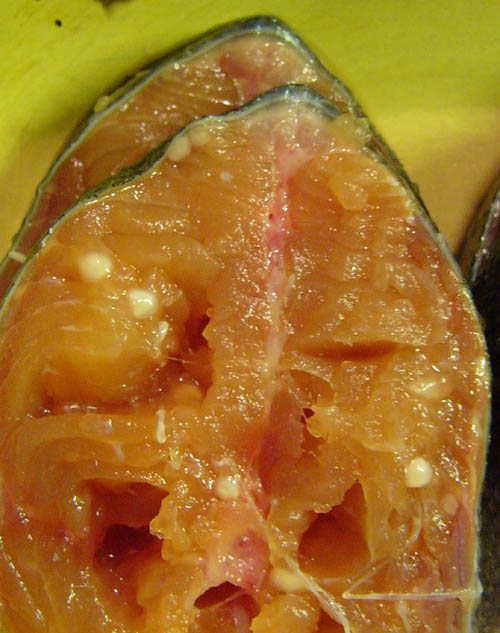
Henneguya zschokkei in salmon beard

Diseases can have a variety of causes, including bacterial infections from an external source such as Pseudomonas fluorescens (causing fin rot and fish dropsy), fungal infections (Saprolegnia), mould infections (Oomycete and Saprolegnia), parasitic disorders (Gyrodactylus salaris, Ichthyophthirius multifiliis, Cryptocaryon, Oodinium causing velvet disease, Brooklynella hostilis, head and lateral line erosion, Glugea, Ceratomyxa shasta, Kudoa thyrsites, Tetracapsuloides bryosalmonae, Ceratomyxa shasta leeches, nematode, Trematoda, Platyhelminthes and fish louse), viral disorders.

External bacterial infections may cause spots or streaks on the body which appear red or orange Dropsy (bloating) is also a sign of a bacterial infection. "False fungal infections" look like fungus but is actually a bacterial infection known as Columnaris. These symptoms may include a white or gray film on the body.

=== Bacterial ===
Bacteria are the most common cause of infectious disease in ornamental fish.

=== Non-infectious ===
Noninfectious diseases can be caused by metabolic disorders, inappropriate water conditions (insufficient aeration, pH, water hardness, temperature and ammonia poisoning) and malnutrition.

== Prevention ==
Disease cures are almost always more expensive and less effective than simple prevention measures. Often precautions involve maintaining a stable aquarium that is adjusted for the specific species of fish that are kept and not over-crowding a tank or over-feeding the fish. Common preventive strategies include avoiding the introduction of infected fish, invertebrates or plants by quarantining new additions before adding them to an established tank, and discarding water from external sources rather than mixing it with clean water. Similarly, foods for herbivorous fish such as lettuce or cucumbers should be washed before being placed in the tank. Containers that do not have water filters or pumps to circulate water can also increase stress to fish. Other stresses on fish and tanks can include certain chemicals, soaps and detergents, and impacts to tank walls causing shock waves that can damage fish.

== Treatment ==
In some cases the causes of an infection or disease will be obvious (such as fin rot), though in other cases it may be due to water conditions, requiring special testing equipment and chemicals to appropriately adjust the water. Isolating diseased fish can help prevent the spread of infection to healthy fish in the tank. This also allows the use of chemicals or drugs which may damage the nitrogen cycle, plants or chemical filtration of a properly-functioning tank. Other alternatives include short baths in a bucket that contains the treated water. Salt baths can be used as an antiseptic and fungicide, and will not damage beneficial bacteria, though ordinary table salt may contain additives which can harm fish. Alternatives include aquarium salt, Kosher salt or rock salt. Gradually raising the temperature of the tank may kill certain parasites, though some diseased fish may be harmed and certain species can not tolerate high temperatures. Aeration is necessary since less oxygen is dissolved in warm water.

There are a number of effective treatments for many strains of bacterial infections. Three of the most common are tetracycline, penicillin and naladixic acid. Salt baths are another effective treatment.

== See also ==
- Fish diseases and parasites
- List of aquarium diseases
