= List of aquarium diseases =

The following is a list of aquarium diseases. Aquarium fish are often susceptible to numerous diseases, due to the artificially limited and concentrated environment. New fish can sometimes introduce diseases to aquaria, and these can be difficult to diagnose and treat. Most fish diseases are also aggravated when the fish is stressed.

Common aquarium diseases include the following:

== Freshwater ==
Disease	Cause	Fish Affected	Image	Symptoms	Treatment
Neon tetra disease	Pleistophora hyphessobryconis (Microsporidia)	Neon tetras, zebrafish, various aquarium fish		Heavily infected fish appear emaciated and lethargic. Infection targets skeletal muscle, which will appear more opaque through the skin.	
Piscine tuberculosis	Mycobacterium marinum bacteria	All		Weight loss evident on underparts, with corresponding loss of appetite, papules, discoloration and bulging eyes.	Amputation
Fin rot	Bacterial or Fungal	All		Erosion at edges of fins	Improve water quality. Aquarium salt baths can treat mild cases. Use anti-fungal meds if visible film/spores/tufts. Use gram-negative antibiotics otherwise.
Columnaris	Flexibacter bacteria	All		Cottony growth near mouth and or patches of grayish-white film on the body or fins.	Improve water conditions. Early or mild cases can be treated externally with active ingredients like chloramphenicol, nifurpirinol, nifurprazine and oxolinic acid. If late stage, meds should be given mixed with food. A antibacterial polymer like Seachem Focus can be used. Oxytetracycline and Nitrofuran should be use internally. A mixture of Kanamycin and nitrofurazone mixed with food are also a popular remedy in online forums.
Swim bladder disease	Varies from constipation, physical damage or bacterial infection of the swim bladder.	All, especially balloon mollies		Inability to balance in the water, sinking or floating, belly-up	Constipation can be treated with Epsom salt baths. Frozen de-shelled blanched pea pieces can be fed as a last resort. Bacterial infections are treated with water changes and gram-negative antibiotics like Kanaplex. Often if the swim bladder has already been damaged, it cannot be repaired.
Vibrosis	Vibrio bacteria	All		Discoloration, reddish staining of fins, bulging eyes, lethargic behavior	Medicated food
Pseudomoniasis	Pseudomonas bacteria	All		Hemorrhages in mouth and ulceration on body	Medicated food
Saprolegnia	Oomycetic	All		Whitish, fur-like growths	Vitamin C enriched food, or a commercial remedy in a medical bath. Check to make sure that your fish doesn't prefer Brackish water
Egg fungus	Fungal	Eggs only		Fungal growths on eggs	Remove affected eggs. Use methylene blue to medicate the hatching tank.
Lymphocystis	Viral	All		Cauliflower-like growths and white areas around the eyes	Vaccines may be available
Iridovirus dwarf gourami disease	Viral	Gouramis, angelfish, Ramirez dwarf cichlids and others		loss of appetite. Darkening in color. Enlarged abdomen. Occasionally lymphocystis	None
Singapore angelfish diseases		Angelfish		Inactivity, loss of appetite, high and rapid mortality	None
Malawi bloat	Probably viral	Lake Malawi cichlids, especially vegetarian ones		Similar to dropsy	Offer a high-fiber diet
White spots (ich)	Ichthyophthirius multifiliis parasite	All		Small white spots, which may ulcerate	Treat water with commercially available remedies
Hole-in-the-head	Hexamita parasite	Discus and cichlids		Pale ulcerated area around head	Metronidazole or similar medication. Use food containing vitamin C
Skin or gill flukes	Gyrodactylus and Dactylogyrus parasites	All		Labored breathing, scraping against objects, abnormal gill function	Commercially available medication
Anchor worm	Lernaea parasite	All		Visible parasites attached to body leading to ulceration and irritation	Remove parasites with forceps and use a medicated bath to prevent secondary infection. Insecticide may help.
Dropsy		All		Bloat, scales stick out	Constipation can be treated with Epsom salt baths. Frozen de-shelled blanched pea pieces can be fed as a last resort. Bacterial infections are treated with water changes and gram-negative antibiotics like Kanaplex. Often if the swim bladder has already been damaged, it cannot be repaired.
Tetrahymena	Parasite	Freshwater fish			None
Icthyobodosis	Parasite				Treatment of water with formalin, salt, and potassium permanganate or copper sulfate.
Nocardiosis	Bacteria				Successful treatment with sulphamethoxazole, doxycycline, and minocycline have been reported

== Saltwater ==
- Cryptocaryon (marine ich)
- Marine velvet or coral reef fish disease
- Anemonefish disease

== Both ==
Disease	Cause	Fish Affected	Image	Symptoms	Treatment
Marine velvet	Amyloodinium parasite	All, fresh and salt water		Powdered appearance, gasping and disorganized swimming	
Velvet disease	Oodinium and other parasites	All salt and freshwater fish		Golden dots, rubbing against rocks while swimming	
Septicemia or Egtved virus	Viral hemorrhagic septicemia virus	Many fresh and salt water fish		hemorrhaging, internal and external	Virkon AQUATIC

== Quarantine ==
The goal of quarantine is to prevent problems in the main tank due to sickness. A quarantine tank should be used before to introduce any newly acquired animals in the main tank and to treat fish that are already sick. By doing this, the aquarist can avoid the spread of the disease and make it easier to treat the fish.

== See also ==
- Fish diseases and parasites

== Bibliography ==
- Encyclopedia of Aquarium and Pond Fish (2005) (David Alderton), DK Publishing, ISBN 978-0756609412
