= Fish diseases and parasites =

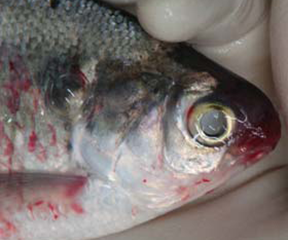
This gizzard shad has VHS, a deadly infectious disease which causes bleeding. It affects over 50 species of freshwater and marine fish in the northern hemisphere.

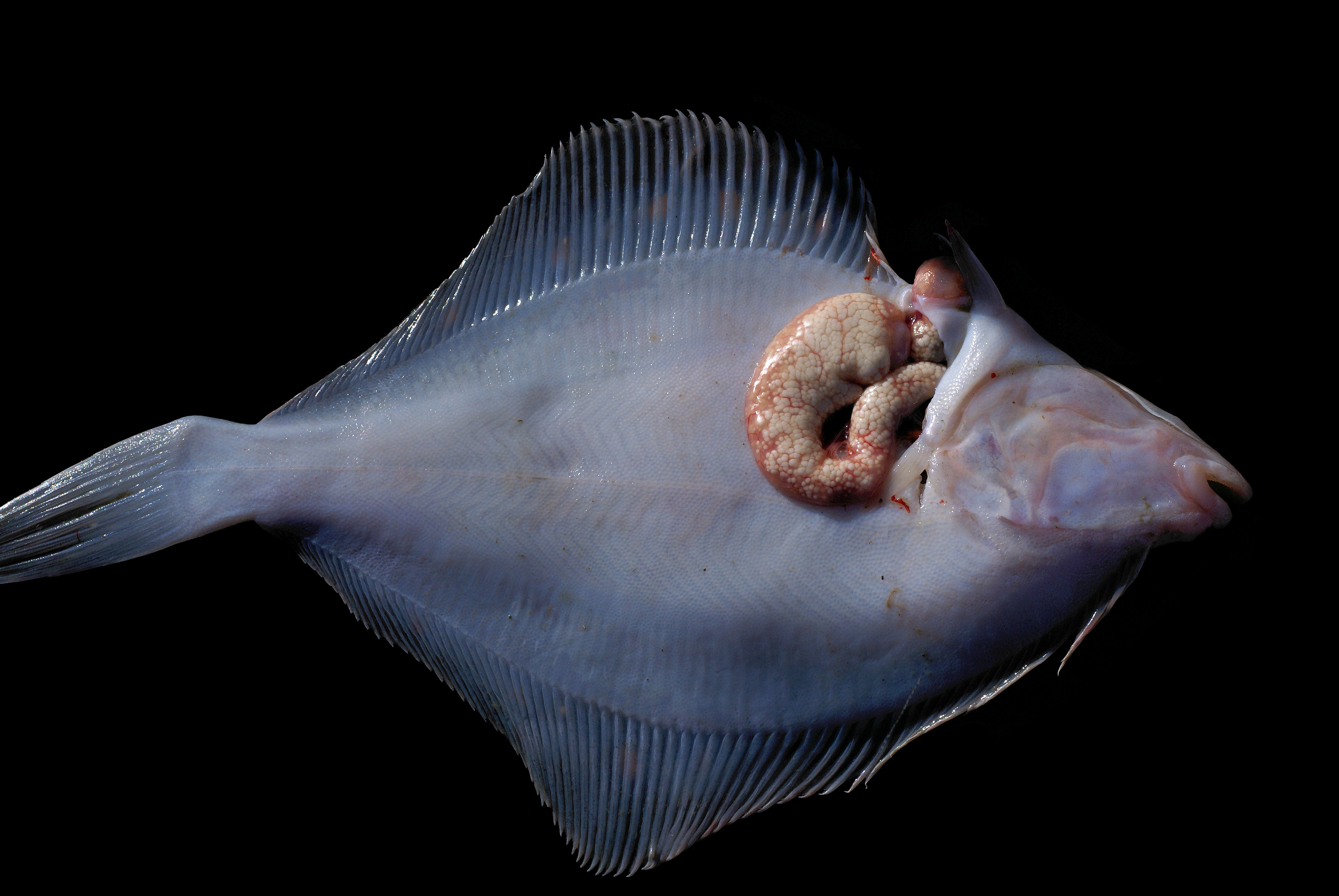
This flatfish Limanda limanda has an outgrowth called a xenoma. It is caused by a microsporidian fungal parasite in its intestines.

Like humans and other animals, fish suffer from diseases and parasites. Fish defences against disease are specific and non-specific. Non-specific defences include skin and scales, as well as the mucus layer secreted by the epidermis that traps microorganisms and inhibits their growth. If pathogens breach these defences, fish can develop inflammatory responses that increase the flow of blood to infected areas and deliver white blood cells that attempt to destroy the pathogens.

Specific defences are specialised responses to particular pathogens recognised by the fish's body, that is adaptative immune responses. In recent years, vaccines have become widely used in aquaculture and ornamental fish, for example vaccines for commercial food fishes like Aeromonas salmonicida, furunculosis in salmon and Lactococcosis\Streptococcosis in farmed grey mullet, Tilapia and koi herpes virus in koi.

Some commercially important fish diseases are VHS, ICH, and whirling disease.

== Parasites ==
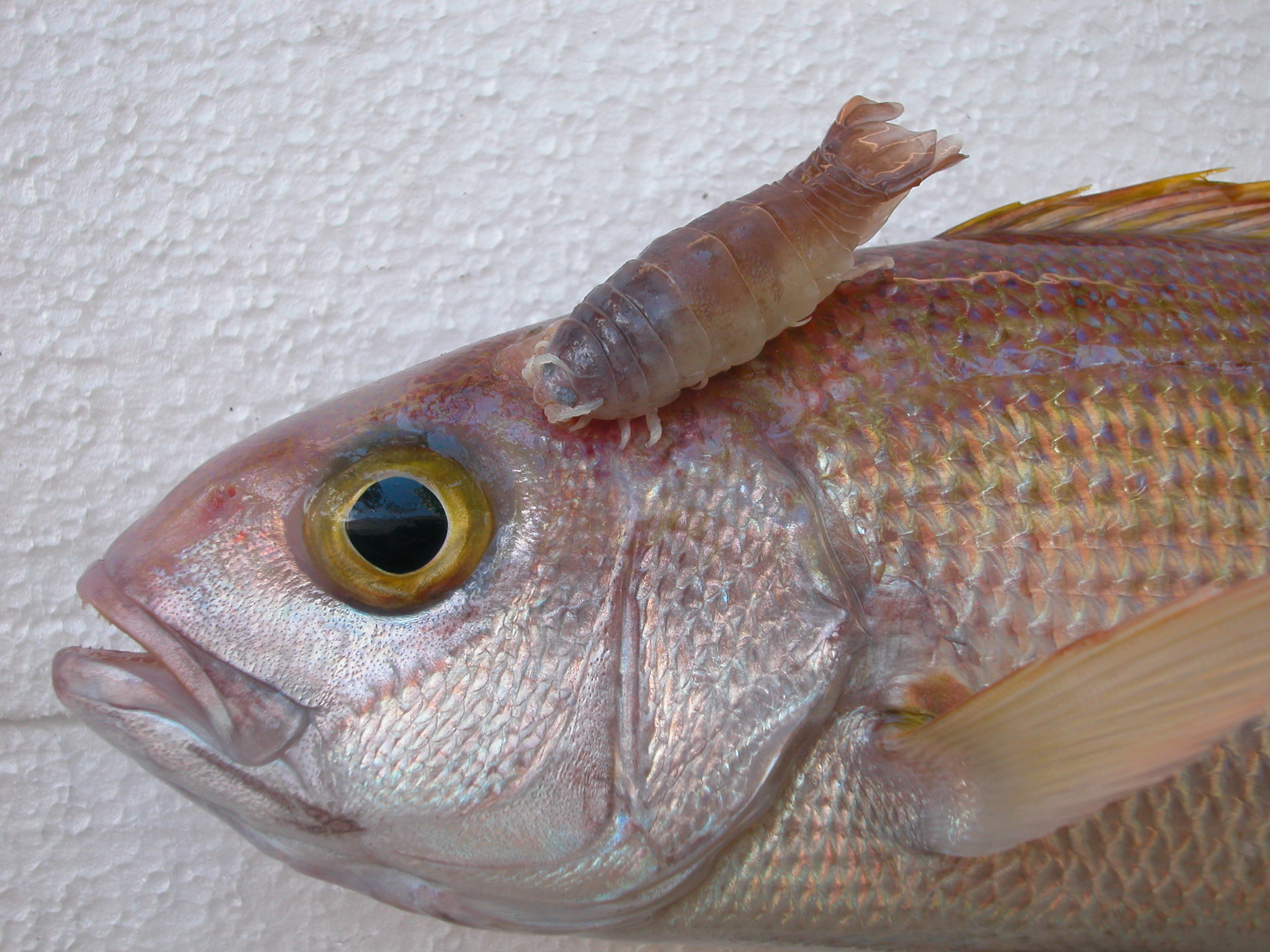
The isopod Anilocra gigantea parasitising the snapper [Pristipomoides filamentosus]

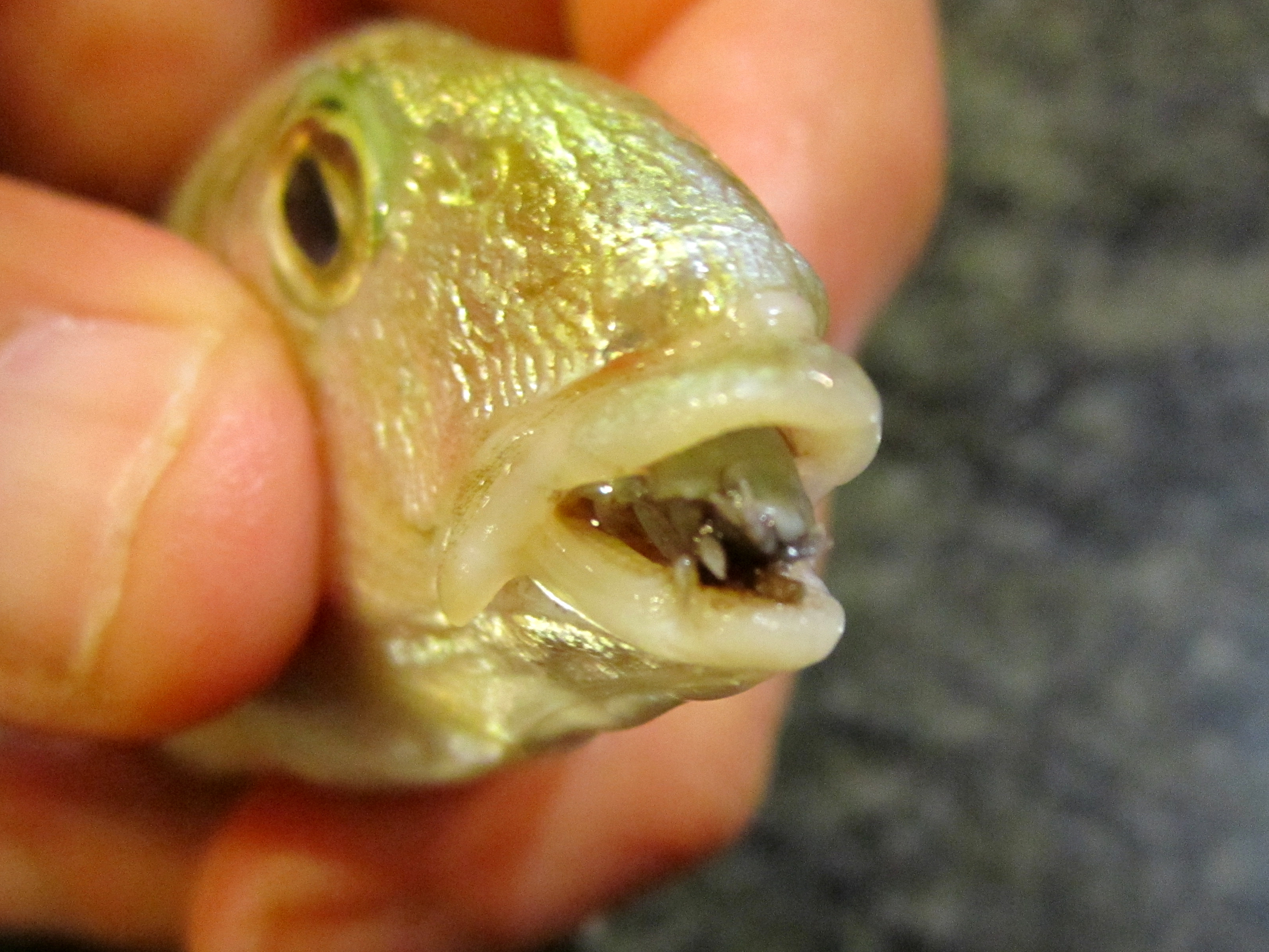
Cymothoa exigua is a parasitic crustacean which enters a fish through its gills and destroys the fish's tongue.

Velvet disease

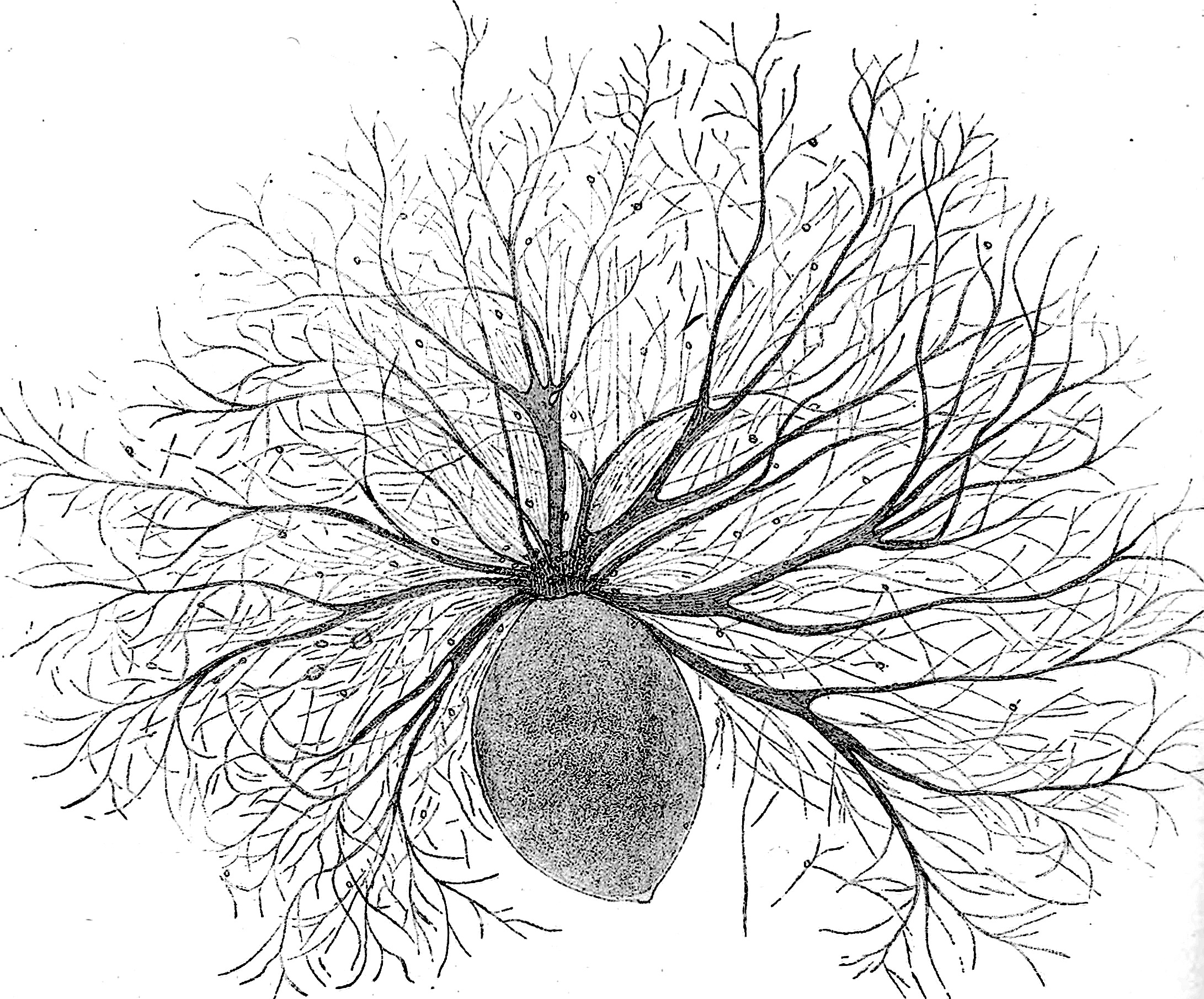
Oodinium, a genus of parasitic dinoflagellates, causes velvet disease in fish

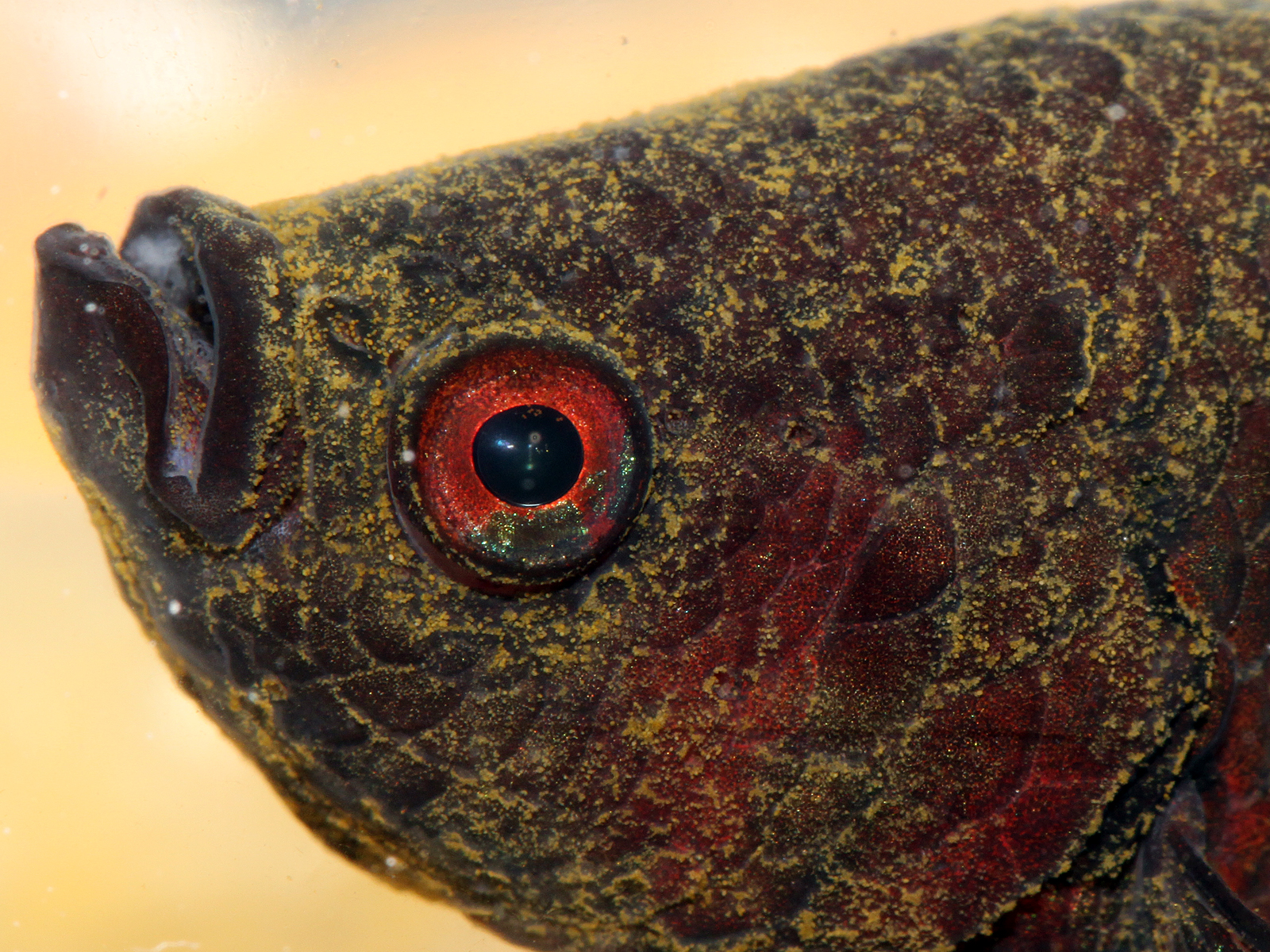
Adult Siamese fighting fish (Betta splendens) with velvet disease

Parasites in fish are a common natural occurrence. Parasites can provide information about host population ecology. In fisheries biology, for example, parasite communities can be used to distinguish distinct populations of the same fish species co-inhabiting a region. Additionally, parasites possess a variety of specialized traits and life-history strategies that enable them to colonize hosts. Understanding these aspects of parasite ecology, of interest in their own right, can illuminate parasite-avoidance strategies employed by hosts.

Usually parasites (and pathogens) need to avoid killing their hosts, since extinct hosts can mean extinct parasites. Evolutionary constraints may operate so parasites avoid killing their hosts, or the natural variability in host defensive strategies may suffice to keep host populations viable. Parasite infections can impair the courtship dance of male threespine sticklebacks. When that happens, the females reject them, suggesting a strong mechanism for the selection of parasite resistance.

However, not all parasites want to keep their hosts alive, and there are parasites with multistage life cycles who go to some trouble to kill their host. For example, some tapeworms make some fish behave in such a way that a predatory bird can catch it. The predatory bird is the next host for the parasite in the next stage of its life cycle. Specifically, the tapeworm Schistocephalus solidus turns infected threespine stickleback white, and then makes them more buoyant so that they splash along at the surface of the water, becoming easy to see and easy to catch for a passing bird.

Parasites can be internal (endoparasites) or external (ectoparasites). One example of an internal parasite is the philometrid nematode Philometra fasciati which is parasitic in the ovary of female Blacktip grouper. The adult female philometrid nematode is a red worm which can reach up to 40 centimetres in length, with a diameter of only 1.6 millimetre; the males are tiny. Other internal parasites are found living inside fish gills, include encysted adult didymozoid trematodes, a few trichosomoidid nematodes of the genus Huffmanela, including Huffmanela ossicola which lives within the gill bone, and the encysted parasitic turbellarian Paravortex. Various protists and Myxosporea are also parasitic on gills, where they form cysts.

Fish gills are also the preferred habitat of many external parasites, attached to the gill but living outside of it. The most common are monogeneans and certain groups of parasitic copepods, which can be extremely numerous. Other external parasites found on gills are leeches and, in seawater, larvae of gnathiid isopods. Isopod fish parasites are mostly external and feed on blood. The larvae of the Gnathiidae family and adult cymothoidids have piercing and sucking mouthparts and clawed limbs adapted for clinging onto their hosts. Cymothoa exigua is a parasite of various marine fish. It causes the tongue of the fish to atrophy and takes its place in what is believed to be the first instance discovered of a parasite functionally replacing a host structure in animals.

Other parasitic disorders, include Gyrodactylus salaris, Ichthyophthirius multifiliis, cryptocaryon, velvet disease, Brooklynella hostilis, Hole in the head, Glugea, Ceratomyxa shasta, Kudoa thyrsites, Tetracapsuloides bryosalmonae, Cymothoa exigua, leeches, nematode, flukes, carp lice and salmon lice.

Although parasites are generally considered to be harmful, the eradication of all parasites would not necessarily be beneficial. Parasites account for as much as or more than half of life's diversity; they perform an important ecological role (by weakening prey) that ecosystems would take some time to adapt to; and without parasites organisms may eventually tend to asexual reproduction, diminishing the diversity of sexually dimorphic traits. Parasites provide an opportunity for the transfer of genetic material between species. On rare, but significant, occasions this may facilitate evolutionary changes that would not otherwise occur, or that would otherwise take even longer.

Below are some life cycles of fish parasites:

Life cycle of the endoparasite Ichthyophthirius multifiliis, commonly called ich

Life cycle of the parasitic fluke Clinostomum marginatum, commonly called the yellow grub

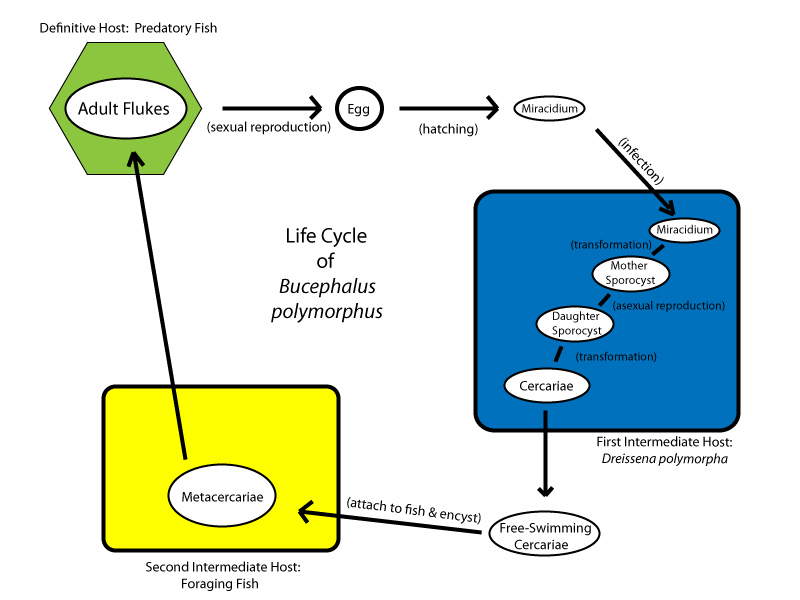
Life cycle of the digenean Bucephalus polymorphus

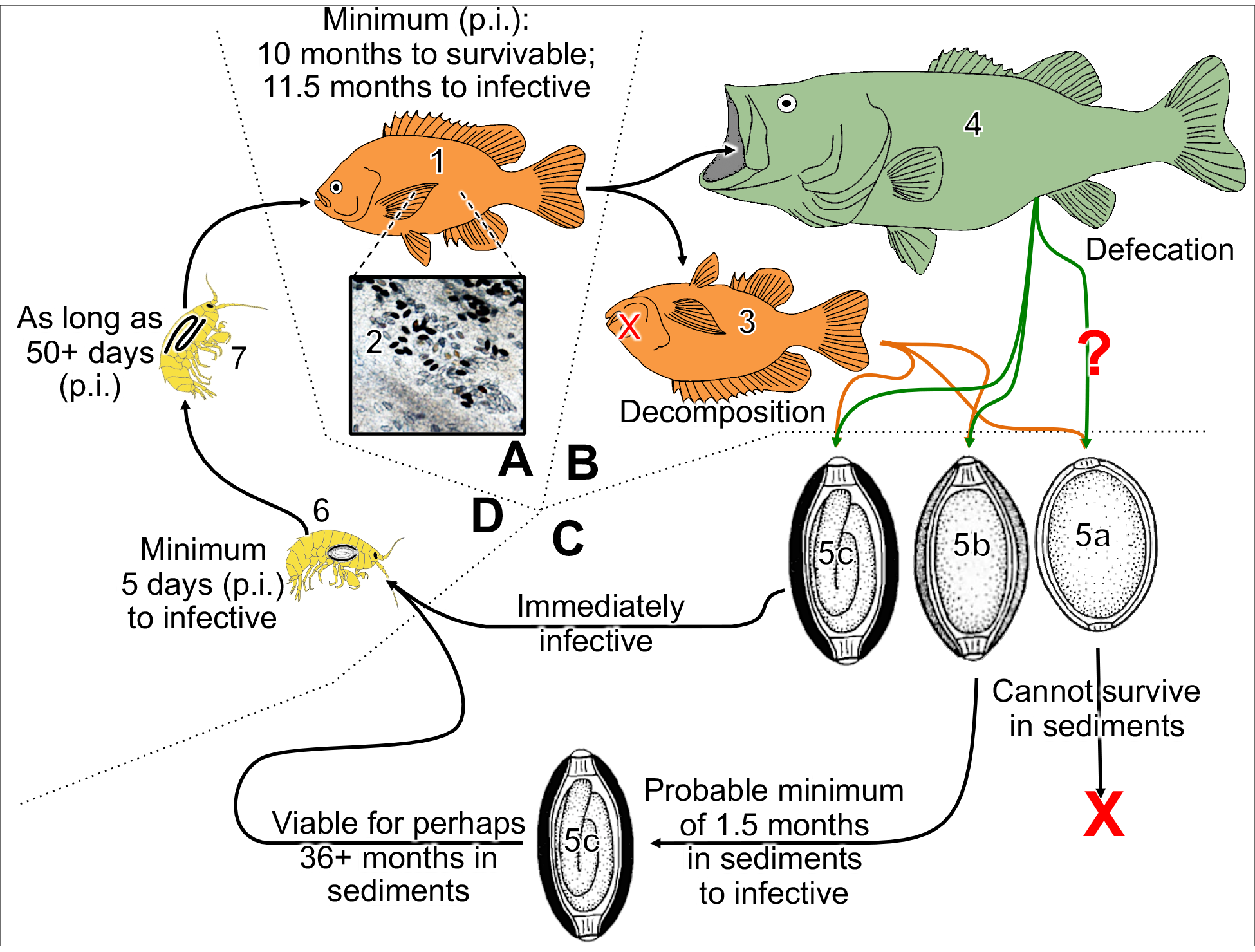
Life cycle of the parasitic nematode Huffmanela huffmani

== Cleaner fish ==
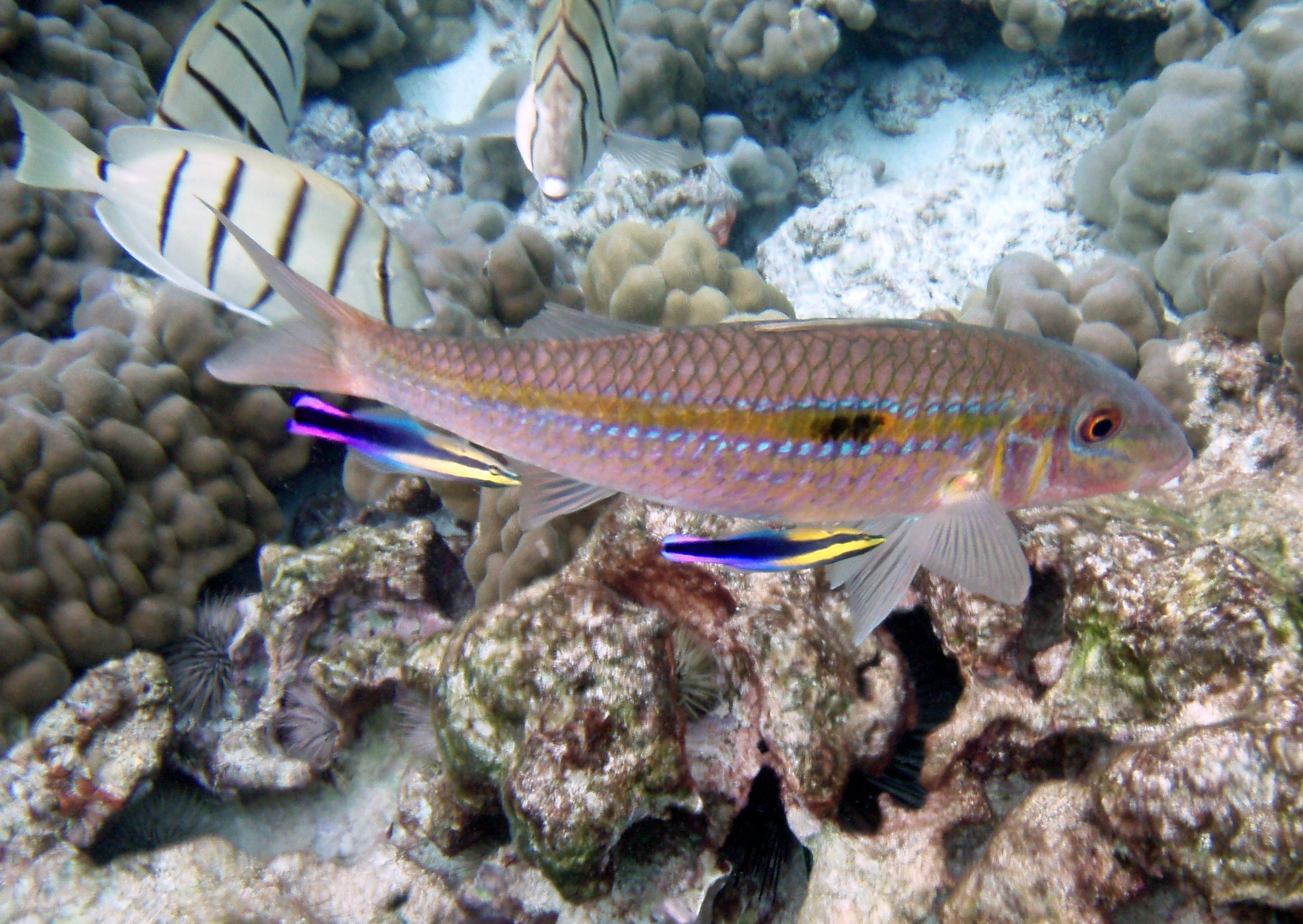
Two cleaner wrasses, Labroides phthirophagus, servicing a goatfish, Mulloidichthys flavolineatus

Some fish take advantage of cleaner fish for the removal of external parasites. The best known of these are the bluestreak cleaner wrasses of the genus Labroides found on coral reefs in the Indian Ocean and Pacific Ocean. These small fish maintain so-called "cleaning stations" where other fish, known as hosts, will congregate and perform specific movements to attract the attention of the cleaner fish. Cleaning behaviours have been observed in a number of other fish groups, including an interesting case between two cichlids of the same genus, Etroplus maculatus, the cleaner fish, and the much larger Etroplus suratensis, the host.

More than 40 species of parasites may reside on the skin and internally of the ocean sunfish, motivating the fish to seek relief in a number of ways. In temperate regions, drifting kelp fields harbour cleaner wrasses and other fish which remove parasites from the skin of visiting sunfish. In the tropics, the mola will solicit cleaner help from reef fishes. By basking on its side at the surface, the sunfish also allows seabirds to feed on parasites from their skin. Sunfish have been reported to breach more than ten feet above the surface, possibly as another effort to dislodge parasites on the body.

== Mass die offs ==
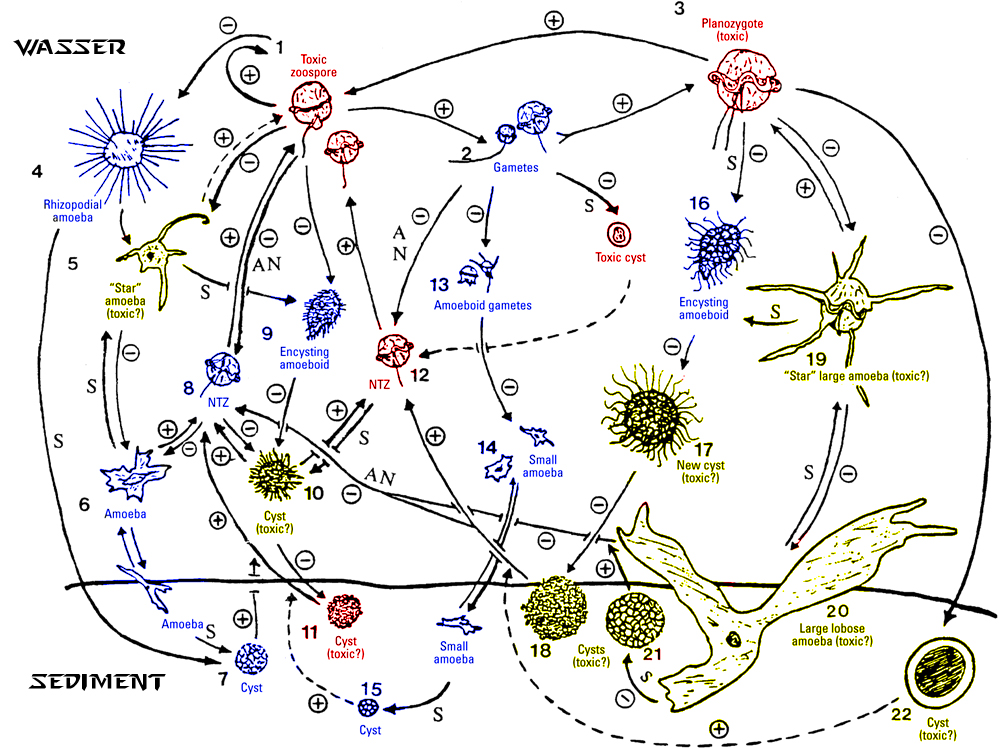
The complex life cycle of Pfiesteria piscidica. Red = toxic stages, yellow = possibly toxic stages, blue = passive stages

Some diseases result in mass die offs. One of the more bizarre and recently discovered diseases produces huge fish kills in shallow marine waters. It is caused by the ambush predator dinoflagellate Pfiesteria piscicida. When large numbers of fish, like shoaling forage fish, are in confined situations such as shallow bays, the excretions from the fish encourage this dinoflagellate, which is not normally toxic, to produce free-swimming zoospores. If the fish remain in the area, continuing to provide nourishment, then the zoospores start secreting a neurotoxin. This toxin results in the fish developing bleeding lesions, and their skin flakes off in the water. The dinoflagellates then eat the blood and flakes of tissue while the affected fish die. Fish kills by this dinoflagellate are common, and they may also have been responsible for kills in the past which were thought to have had other causes. Kills like these can be viewed as natural mechanisms for regulating the population of exceptionally abundant fish. The rate at which the kills occur increases as organically polluted land runoff increases.

== Wild salmon ==
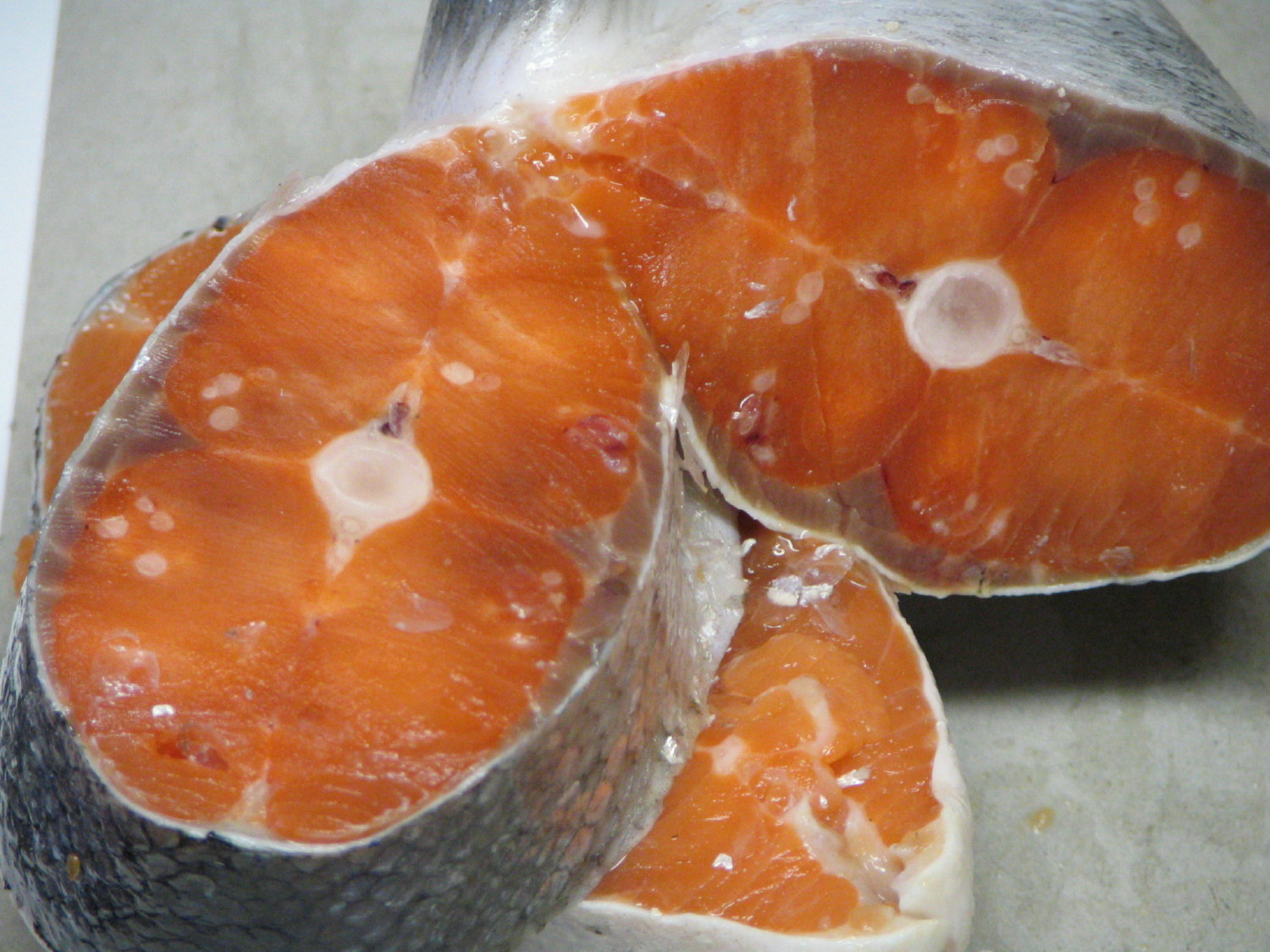
Henneguya salminicola, a parasite commonly found in the flesh of salmonids on the West Coast of Canada. Coho salmon

According to Canadian biologist Dorothy Kieser, protozoan parasite Henneguya salminicola is commonly found in the flesh of salmonids. It has been recorded in the field samples of salmon returning to the Queen Charlotte Islands. The fish responds by walling off the parasitic infection into a number of cysts that contain milky fluid. This fluid is an accumulation of a large number of parasites.

Henneguya and other parasites in the myxosporean group have a complex lifecycle where the salmon is one of two hosts. The fish releases the spores after spawning. In the Henneguya case, the spores enter a second host, most likely an invertebrate, in the spawning stream. When juvenile salmon out-migrate to the Pacific Ocean, the second host releases a stage infective to salmon. The parasite is then carried in the salmon until the next spawning cycle. The myxosporean parasite that causes whirling disease in trout, has a similar lifecycle. However, as opposed to whirling disease, the Henneguya infestation does not appear to cause disease in the host salmon — even heavily infected fish tend to return to spawn successfully.

According to Dr. Kieser, a lot of work on Henneguya salminicola was done by scientists at the Pacific Biological Station in Nanaimo in the mid-1980s, in particular, an overview report which states that "the fish that have the longest fresh water residence time as juveniles have the most noticeable infections. Hence in order of prevalence coho are most infected followed by sockeye, chinook, chum and pink." As well, the report says that, at the time the studies were conducted, stocks from the middle and upper reaches of large river systems in British Columbia such as Fraser, Skeena, Nass and from mainland coastal streams in the southern half of B.C. "are more likely to have a low prevalence of infection." The report also states "It should be stressed that Henneguya, economically deleterious though it is, is harmless from the view of public health. It is strictly a fish parasite that cannot live in or affect warm blooded animals, including man".

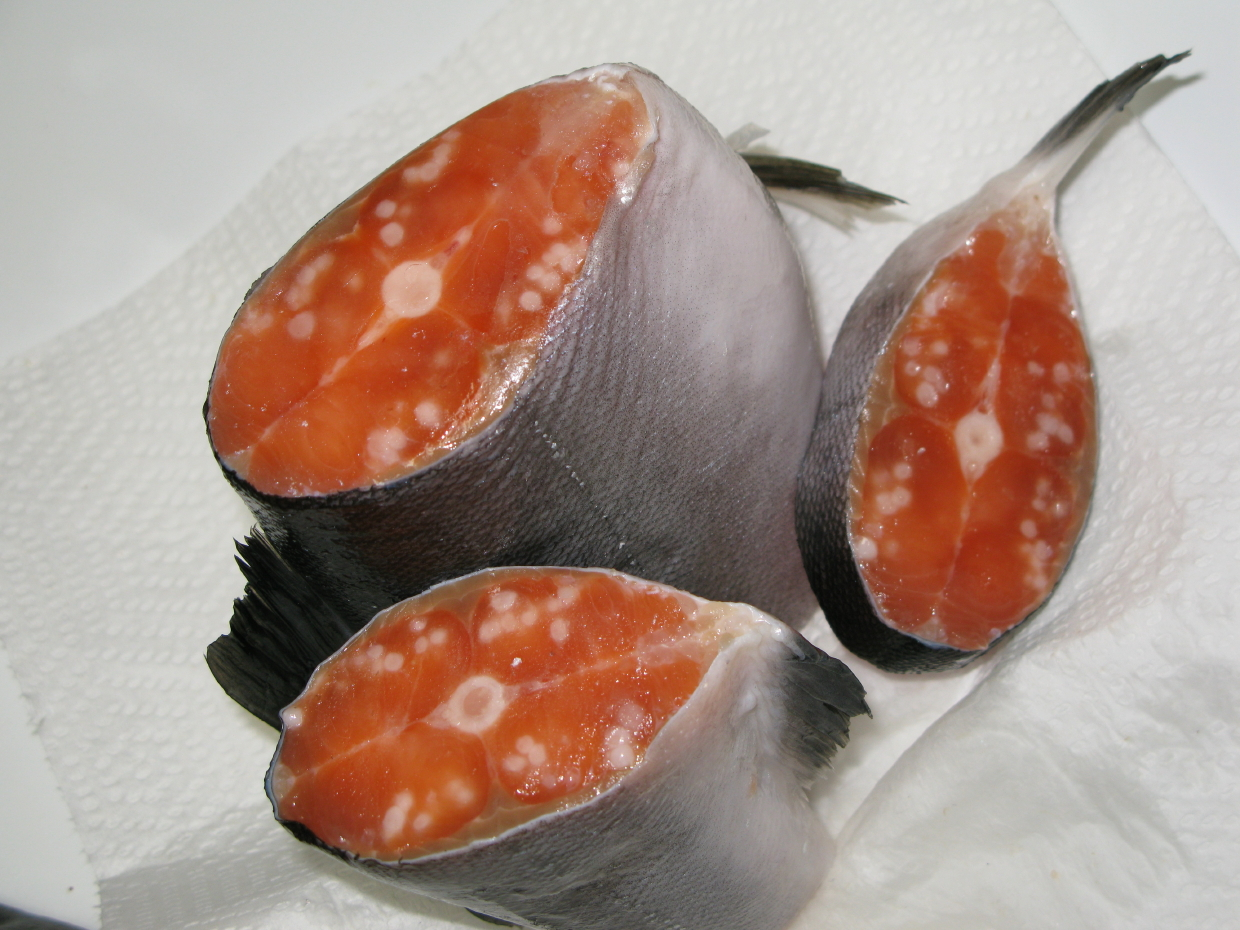
Sample of pink salmon infected with Henneguya salminicola, caught off Haida Gwaii, Western Canada in 2009

According to Klaus Schallie, Molluscan Shellfish Program Specialist with the Canadian Food Inspection Agency, "Henneguya salminicola is found in southern B.C. also and in all species of salmon. I have previously examined smoked chum salmon sides that were riddled with cysts and some sockeye runs in Barkley Sound (southern B.C., west coast of Vancouver Island) are noted for their high incidence of infestation."

Sea lice, particularly Lepeophtheirus salmonis and a variety of Caligus species, including Caligus clemensi and Caligus rogercresseyi, can cause deadly infestations of both farm-grown and wild salmon. Sea lice are ectoparasites which feed on mucous, blood, and skin, and migrate and latch onto the skin of wild salmon during free-swimming, planktonic naupli and copepodid larval stages, which can persist for several days. Large numbers of highly populated, open-net salmon farms can create exceptionally large concentrations of sea lice; when exposed in river estuaries containing large numbers of open-net farms, many young wild salmon are infected, and do not survive as a result. Adult salmon may survive otherwise critical numbers of sea lice, but small, thin-skinned juvenile salmon migrating to sea are highly vulnerable. On the Pacific coast of Canada, the louse-induced mortality of pink salmon in some regions is commonly over 80%.

== Farmed salmon ==
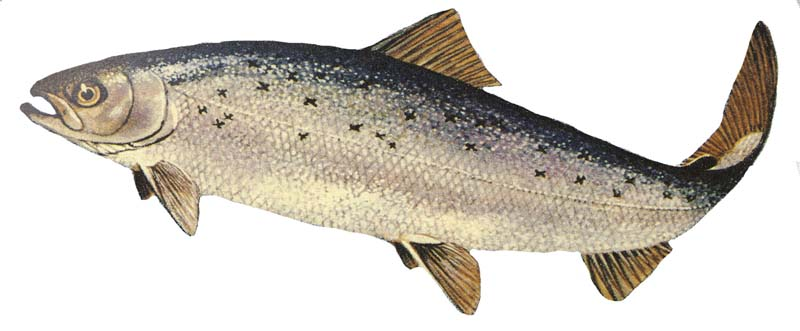
Atlantic salmon

In 1972, Gyrodactylus salaris, also called salmon fluke, a monogenean parasite, spread from Norwegian hatcheries to wild salmon, and devastated some wild salmon populations.

In 1984, infectious salmon anemia (ISAV) was discovered in Norway in an Atlantic salmon hatchery. Eighty percent of the fish in the outbreak died. ISAV, a viral disease, is now a major threat to the viability of Atlantic salmon farming. It is now the first of the diseases classified on List One of the European Commission's fish health regime. Amongst other measures, this requires the total eradication of the entire fish stock should an outbreak of the disease be confirmed on any farm. ISAV seriously affects salmon farms in Chile, Norway, Scotland and Canada, causing major economic losses to infected farms. As the name implies, it causes severe anemia of infected fish. Unlike mammals, the red blood cells of fish have DNA, and can become infected with viruses. The fish develop pale gills, and may swim close to the water surface, gulping for air. However, the disease can also develop without the fish showing any external signs of illness, the fish maintain a normal appetite, and then they suddenly die. The disease can progress slowly throughout an infected farm and, in the worst cases, death rates may approach 100 per cent. It is also a threat to the dwindling stocks of wild salmon. Management strategies include developing a vaccine and improving genetic resistance to the disease.

In the wild, diseases and parasites are normally at low levels, and kept in check by natural predation on weakened individuals. In crowded net pens they can become epidemics. Diseases and parasites also transfer from farmed to wild salmon populations. A recent study in British Columbia links the spread of parasitic sea lice from river salmon farms to wild pink salmon in the same river. The European Commission (2002) concluded "The reduction of wild salmonid abundance is also linked to other factors but there is more and more scientific evidence establishing a direct link between the number of lice-infested wild fish and the presence of cages in the same estuary." It is reported that wild salmon on the west coast of Canada are being driven to extinction by sea lice from nearby salmon farms. Antibiotics and pesticides are often used to control the diseases and parasites.

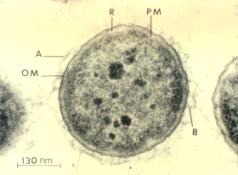
Aeromonas salmonicida, a Gram-negative bacteria, causes the disease furunculosis in marine and freshwater fish.

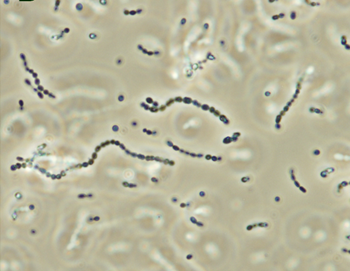
Streptococcus iniae, a Gram-positive, sphere-shaped bacteria caused losses in farmed marine and freshwater finfish of US$100 million in 1997.

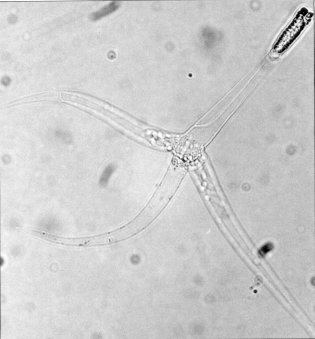
Myxobolus cerebralis, a myxosporean parasite, causes whirling disease in farmed salmon and trout and also in wild fish populations.

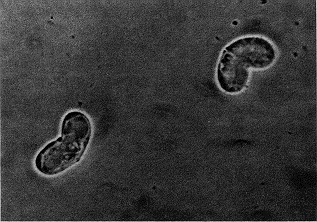
Ceratomyxa shasta, another myxosporean parasite, infects salmonid fish on the Pacific coast of North America.

== Coral reef fish ==
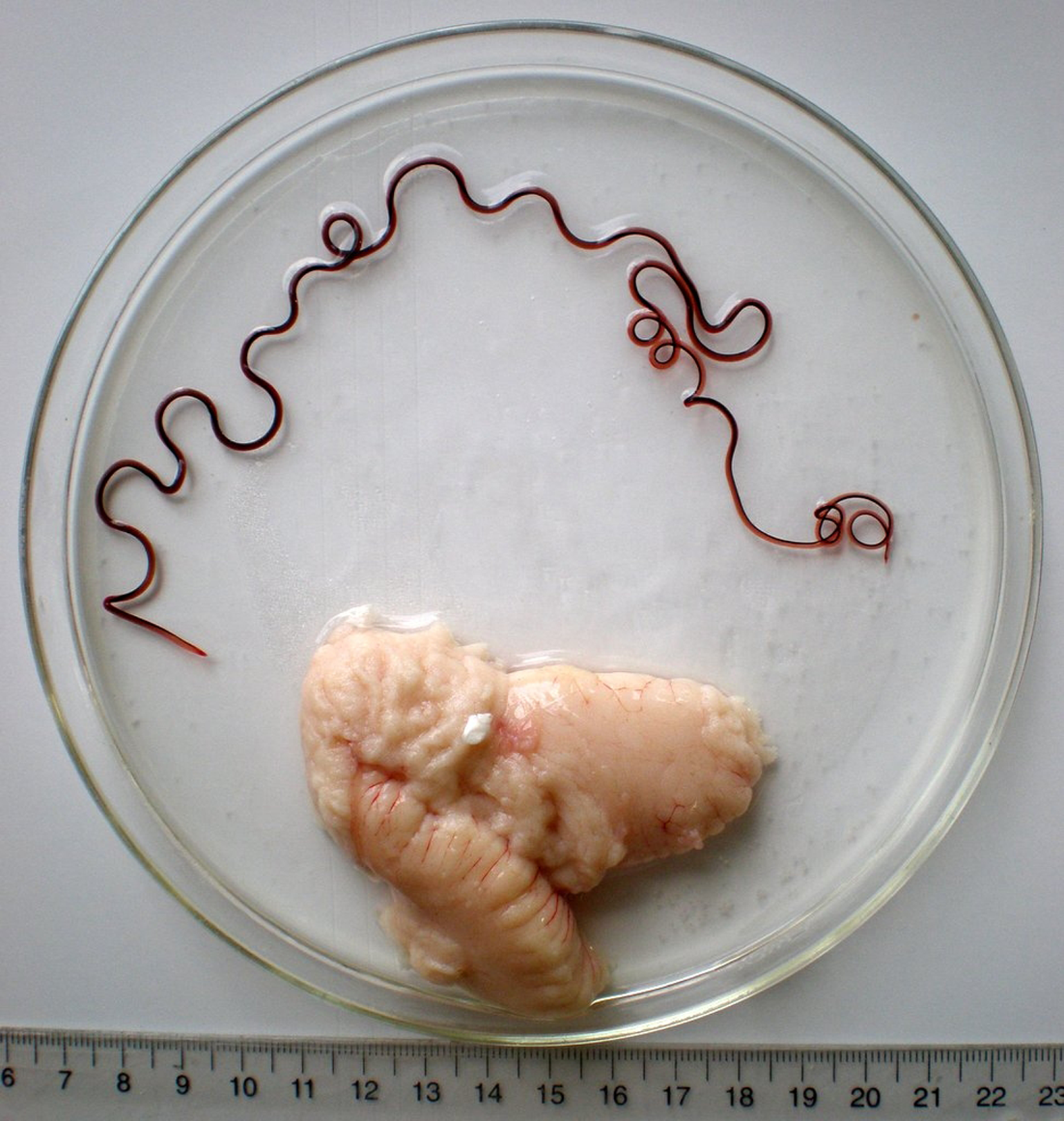
Philometra fasciati (Nematoda), a roundworm parasitic of the ovary of the blacktip grouper

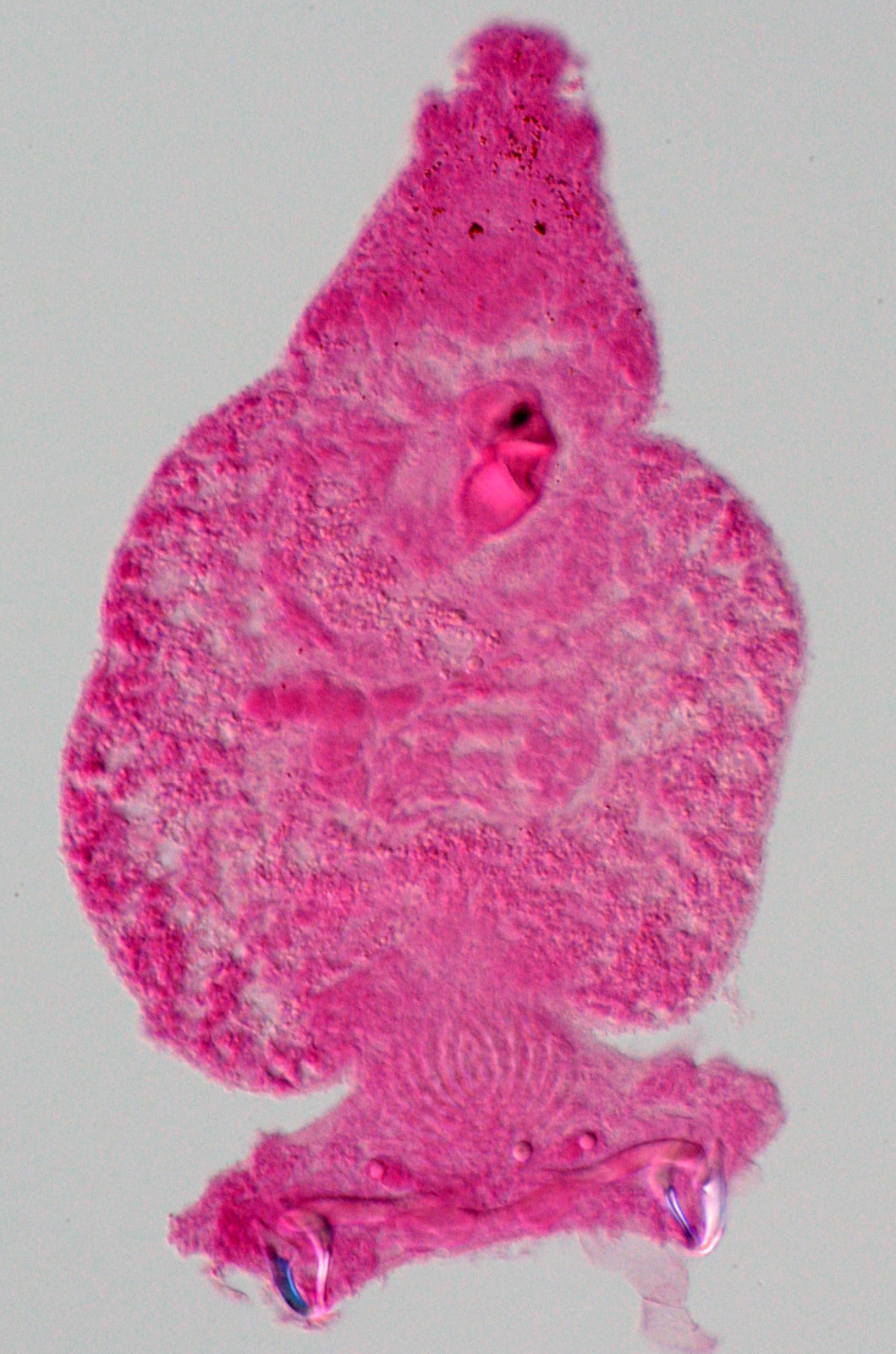
Monogenean parasite on the gill of a grouper

Coral reef fish are characterized by high biodiversity. As a consequence parasites of coral reef fish show tremendous variety. Parasites of coral reef fish include nematodes, Platyhelminthes (cestodes, digeneans, and monogeneans), leeches, parasitic crustaceans such as isopods and copepods, and various microorganisms such as myxosporidia and microsporidia. Some of these fish parasites have heteroxenous life cycles (i.e. they have several hosts) among which sharks (certain cestodes) or molluscs (digeneans). The high biodiversity of coral reefs increases the complexity of the interactions between parasites and their various and numerous hosts. Numerical estimates of parasite biodiversity have shown that certain coral fish species have up to 30 species of parasites. The mean number of parasites per fish species is about ten. This has a consequence in term of co-extinction. Results obtained for the coral reef fish of New Caledonia suggest that extinction of a coral reef fish species of average size would eventually result in the co-extinction of at least ten species of parasites.

== Aquarium fish ==
Nitrogen cycle in a common aquarium.

Ornamental fish kept in aquariums are susceptible to numerous diseases.

In most aquarium tanks, the fish are at high concentrations and the volume of water is limited. This means that communicable diseases can spread rapidly to most or all fish in a tank. An improper nitrogen cycle, inappropriate aquarium plants and potentially harmful freshwater invertebrates can directly harm or add to the stresses on ornamental fish in a tank. Despite this, many diseases in captive fish can be avoided or prevented through proper water conditions and a well-adjusted ecosystem within the tank. Ammonia poisoning is a common disease in new aquariums, especially when immediately stocked to full capacity.

Due to their generally small size and the low cost of replacing diseased or dead aquarium fish, the cost of testing and treating diseases is often seen as more trouble than the value of the fish.

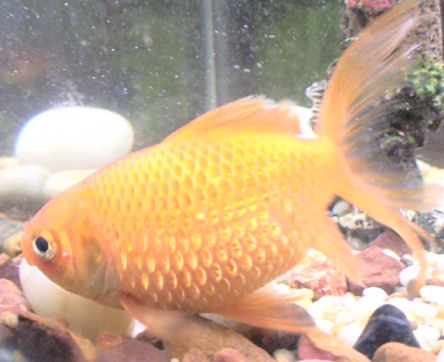
Goldfish with dropsy

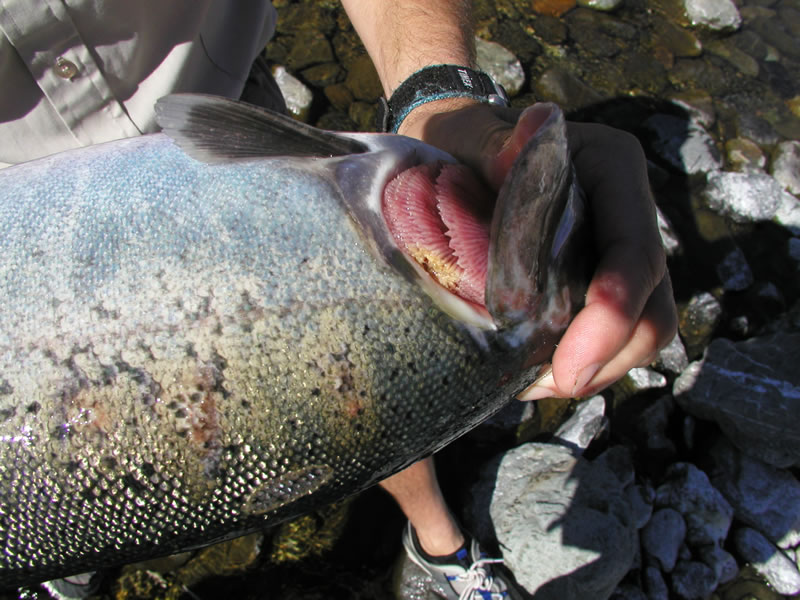
Columnaris in the gill of a chinook salmon

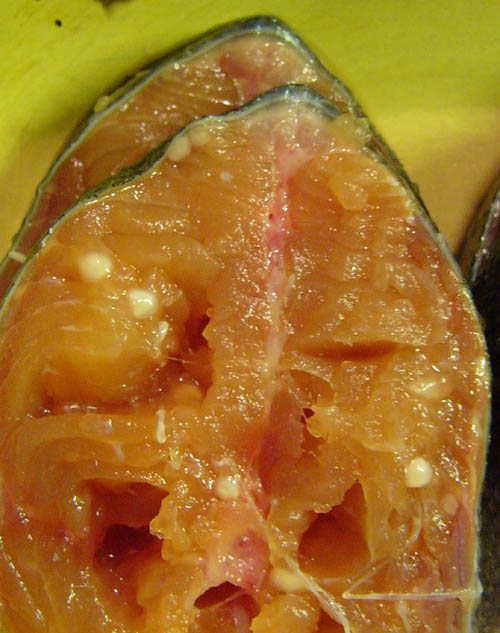
The parasite Henneguya zschokkei in salmon beard

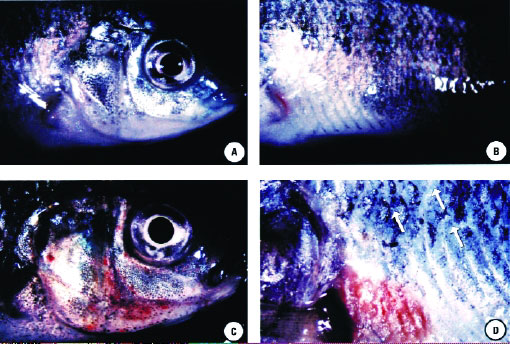
Skin ulcers in tilapia exposed to Pfiesteria shumwayae

== Immune system ==
Immune organs vary by type of fish. In the jawless fish (lampreys and hagfish), true lymphoid organs are absent. These fish rely on regions of lymphoid tissue within other organs to produce immune cells. For example, erythrocytes, macrophages and plasma cells are produced in the anterior kidney (or pronephros) and some areas of the gut (where granulocytes mature.) They resemble primitive bone marrow in hagfish. Cartilaginous fish (sharks and rays) have a more advanced immune system. They have three specialized organs that are unique to chondrichthyes; the epigonal organs (lymphoid tissue similar to mammalian bone) that surround the gonads, the Leydig's organ within the walls of their esophagus, and a spiral valve in their intestine. These organs house typical immune cells (granulocytes, lymphocytes and plasma cells). They also possess an identifiable thymus and a well-developed spleen (their most important immune organ) where various lymphocytes, plasma cells and macrophages develop and are stored. Chondrostean fish (sturgeons, paddlefish and bichirs) possess a major site for the production of granulocytes within a mass that is associated with the meninges (membranes surrounding the central nervous system.) Their heart is frequently covered with tissue that contains lymphocytes, reticular cells and a small number of macrophages. The chondrostean kidney is an important hemopoietic organ; where erythrocytes, granulocytes, lymphocytes and macrophages develop.

Like chondrostean fish, the major immune tissues of bony fish (or teleostei) include the kidney (especially the anterior kidney), which houses many different immune cells. In addition, teleost fish possess a thymus, spleen and scattered immune areas within mucosal tissues (e.g. in the skin, gills, gut and gonads). Much like the mammalian immune system, teleost erythrocytes, neutrophils and granulocytes are believed to reside in the spleen whereas lymphocytes are the major cell type found in the thymus. In 2006, a lymphatic system similar to that in mammals was described in one species of teleost fish, the zebrafish. Although not confirmed as yet, this system presumably will be where naive (unstimulated) T cells accumulate while waiting to encounter an antigen.

== Spreading disease and parasites ==
The capture, transportation and culture of bait fish can spread damaging organisms between ecosystems, endangering them. In 2007, several American states, including Michigan, enacted regulations designed to slow the spread of fish diseases, including viral hemorrhagic septicemia, by bait fish. Because of the risk of transmitting Myxobolus cerebralis (whirling disease), trout and salmon should not be used as bait. Anglers may increase the possibility of contamination by emptying bait buckets into fishing venues and collecting or using bait improperly. The transportation of fish from one location to another can break the law and cause the introduction of fish and parasites alien to the ecosystem.

== Eating raw fish ==
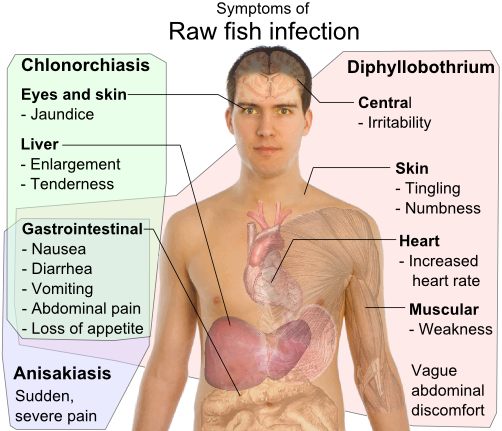
Differential symptoms of parasite infection by raw fish: Clonorchis sinensis (a trematode/fluke), Anisakis (a nematode/roundworm) and Diphyllobothrium a (cestode/tapeworm), all have gastrointestinal, but otherwise distinct, symptoms.

Though not a health concern in thoroughly cooked fish, parasites are a concern when human consumers eat raw or lightly preserved fish such as sashimi, sushi, ceviche, and gravlax. The popularity of such raw fish dishes makes it important for consumers to be aware of this risk. Raw fish should be frozen to an internal temperature of −20 °C (−4 °F) for at least seven days to kill parasites. It is important to be aware that home freezers may not be cold enough to kill parasites.

Traditionally, fish that live all or part of their lives in fresh water were considered unsuitable for sashimi due to the possibility of parasites (see Sashimi article). Parasitic infections from freshwater fish are a serious problem in some parts of the world, particularly Southeast Asia. Fish that spend part of their life cycle in salt water, like salmon, can also be a problem. A study in Seattle, Washington showed that 100% of wild salmon had roundworm larvae capable of infecting people. In the same study farm-raised salmon did not have any roundworm larvae. Historically, parasite infection of humans eating raw fish has been rare in the developed world, though a 2020 meta-analysis of available data shows that since 1980 there has been a sharp increase of parasites in the types of marine fish that are eaten uncooked.

There are three main kinds of parasites: Clonorchis sinensis (a trematode/fluke), Anisakis (a nematode/roundworm) and Diphyllobothrium (a cestode/tapeworm). Infection by the fish tapeworm Diphyllobothrium latum is seen in countries where people eat raw or undercooked fish, such as some countries in Asia, Eastern Europe, Scandinavia, Africa, and North and South America. Infection risk of anisakis is particularly higher in fishes which may live in a river such as salmon (shake) in Salmonidae, mackerel (saba). Such parasite infections can generally be avoided by boiling, burning, preserving in salt or vinegar, or freezing overnight. Even Japanese people never eat raw salmon or ikura (salmon roe), and even if they seem raw, these foods are not raw but are frozen overnight to prevent infections from parasites, particularly anisakis.

Below are some life cycles of fish parasites that can infect humans:

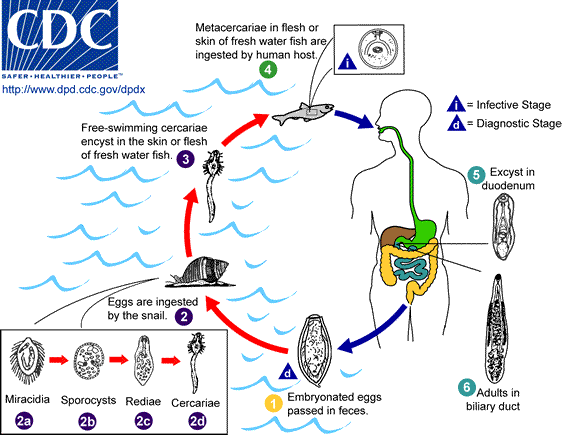
Life cycle of the liver fluke Clonorchis sinensis

Life cycle of the parasitic Anisakis worm

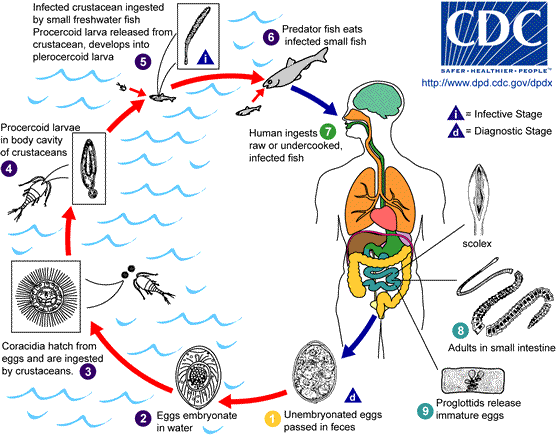
Life cycle of the fish tapeworm Diphyllobothrium latum

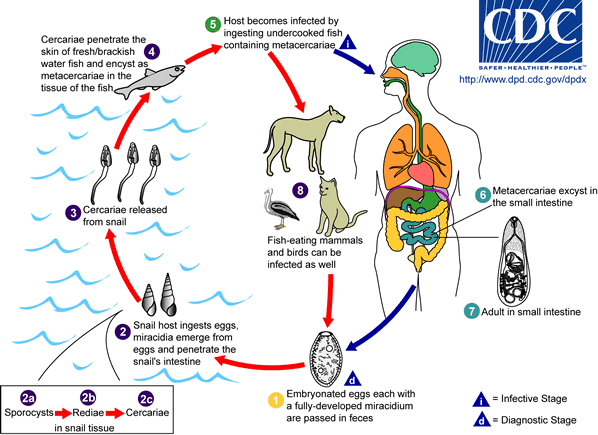
Life cycle of the digenean Metagonimus, an intestinal fluke

== See also ==
- Bath treatment (fishkeeping)
- Cyanotoxin
- Diseases and parasites in cod
- European Community Reference Laboratory for Fish Diseases
- Fish farming
- Fish kill
- Fish toxins
- Fish medicine
- List of aquarium diseases
- Mathematical modelling of infectious disease
- Red tide
- Veterinary parasitology

== General and cited references ==
- Fish Diseases (2017) Edited By Takashi Aoki, UNESCO-EOLSS Publishers.ISBN 9781780210407
- Axelrod HR, Untergasser D (1989). Handbook of fish diseases. Neptune, NJ: T.F.H. Publications. ISBN 978-0-86622-703-2.
- Andrews C (1988). The Manual of Fish Health. Stillwater, MN: Voyageur Press. ISBN 978-1-56465-160-0.
- Exell A, Burgess PH, Bailey MT (29 May 1999). A-Z of Tropical Fish Diseases and Health Problems. New York, N.Y: Howell Book House. ISBN 978-1-58245-049-0.
- Fairfield, T (2000). A commonsense guide to fish health. Woodbury, N.Y: Barron's Educational Series. ISBN 978-0-7641-1338-3.
- U.S. Food and Drug Administration (FDA) (2001) Compliance Regulatory Information: Fish and Fisheries Products Hazards and Controls Guidance Third edition.
- Rohde, Klaus (2005) Marine Parasitology Csiro Publishing. ISBN 9780643099272.
- Moyle, PB and Cech, JJ (2004) Fishes, An Introduction to Ichthyology. 5th Ed, Benjamin Cummings. ISBN 978-0-13-100847-2
- Woo PTK (1995) Fish Diseases and Disorders: Volume 1: Protozoan and Metazoan Infections Cabi Series. ISBN 9780851988238.
- Woo PTK (2011) Fish Diseases and Disorders: Volume 2: Non-Infectious Disorders Cabi Series. ISBN 9781845935535.
- Woo PTK (2011) Fish Diseases and Disorders: Volume 3: Viral, Bacterial and Fungal Infections Cabi Series. ISBN 9781845935542.
