= Iridovirus dwarf gourami disease =

Aquarium disease

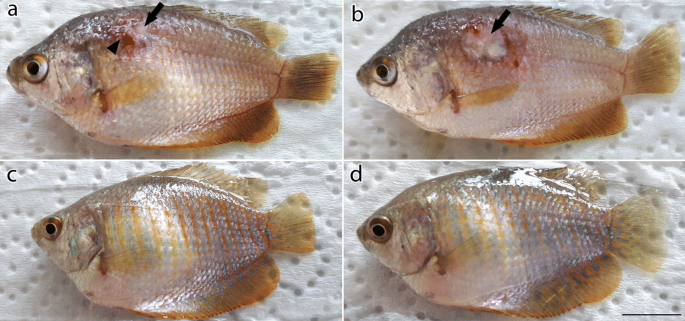
- Dwarf gouramis infected with another disease displaying ulcers, a common symptom of DGD
- Specialty: Aquarium disease
- Symptoms: Loss of colour, loss of appetite and deterioration of muscle.
- Complications: Necrosis of the kidney and spleen
- Usual onset: 1 day-6 months post exposure
- Causes: Megalocytivirus likened by inbreeding
- Risk factors: Highly infectious amongst Gourami
- Diagnostic method: Observation of symptoms
- Prevention: Obtaining Dwarf gourami from reputable sources, keeping them in a low-stress environment. Once infected, avoid adding any gourami to the aquarium for a period of three months
- Treatment: None, always fatal
- Medication: None

Iridovirus dwarf gourami disease is a widespread consequence caused by the poor genetics of the dwarf gourami, a popular fish in the aquarium trade. It is the result of severe inbreeding. Despite being unable to develop the disease, other gourami become prone to infection if a dwarf gourami in the tank gets the Megalocytivirus. Once symptoms develop, the gourami's mortality rate reaches 100% and there is no cure nor treatment.
