= Icthyobodosis =

Parasitic disease

Icthyobodosis (also called icthyobodiasis or costiasis) is a parasitic disease of fish caused by flagellated protozoa in the genus Icthyobodo, including I. necator, I. salmonis, and I. hippoglossi. The disease affects the skin and gills of freshwater and marine fish and is considered an economically important disease in aquaculture worldwide. Historically, the causative organisms were classified in the genus Costia, and the disease is still occasionally referred to as costiasis.

== Etiology ==
Icthyobodo species are classified as kinetoplastids, a group of unicellular, flagellated eukaryotic microorganisms. Kinetoplastids are differentiated from other protozoa by the presence of DNA-containing region in their DNA called a kinetoplast. Icthyobodo parasites measure approximately 5 to 20 μM in length and utilize flagella to propel themselves through flicking motility. Species of Icthyobodo are small obligate parasites that must have a fish host to survive. The parasite attaches to epithelial tissues using a specialized attachment disc with microtubules that penetrate host cells.

The parasites reproduce by transverse binary fission and may form resistant cyst-like stages under unfavorable environmental conditions.

== Distribution and hosts ==
Icthyobodosis has reported worldwide in both wild and farmed fish populations. The disease affects numerous freshwater, brackish, and marine fish species including salmonids, catfish, flatfish, seabass, and ornamental fish. Although historically regarded as a freshwater disease, later studies demonstrated that Icthyobodo species can infect marine and brackish water fish. Young fish are generally more susceptible to severe disease and mortality than adults.

== Aquaculture ==
=== Aquaculture and economic impact ===
Icthyobodosis is considered an economically significant disease in aquaculture and ornamental fish production worldwide. Outbreaks are associated with high-density culture systems and environmental stressors including elevated temperature, poor water quality, elevated ammonia concentrations, and reduced dissolved oxygen. Disease mortality can reach as high as 40%.

=== Pathogenesis ===
The parasite embeds itself within the fish skin and gills which can diminish a fish's ability to maintain water and electrolyte balance in the blood.

Infection with Icthyobodo weakens the fish immune system and damages epithelial barriers, increasingly likelihood of secondary infections.

=== Signs and symptoms ===
Infected fish may present with skin ulcers, darkened skin coloration, and reddening at the base of the dorsal fin. Behavioral changes include lethargy, loss of appetite, or rubbing against objects. Fish may appear healthy during low stages of infection; however, respiratory distress develops which further exacerbates outbreaks.

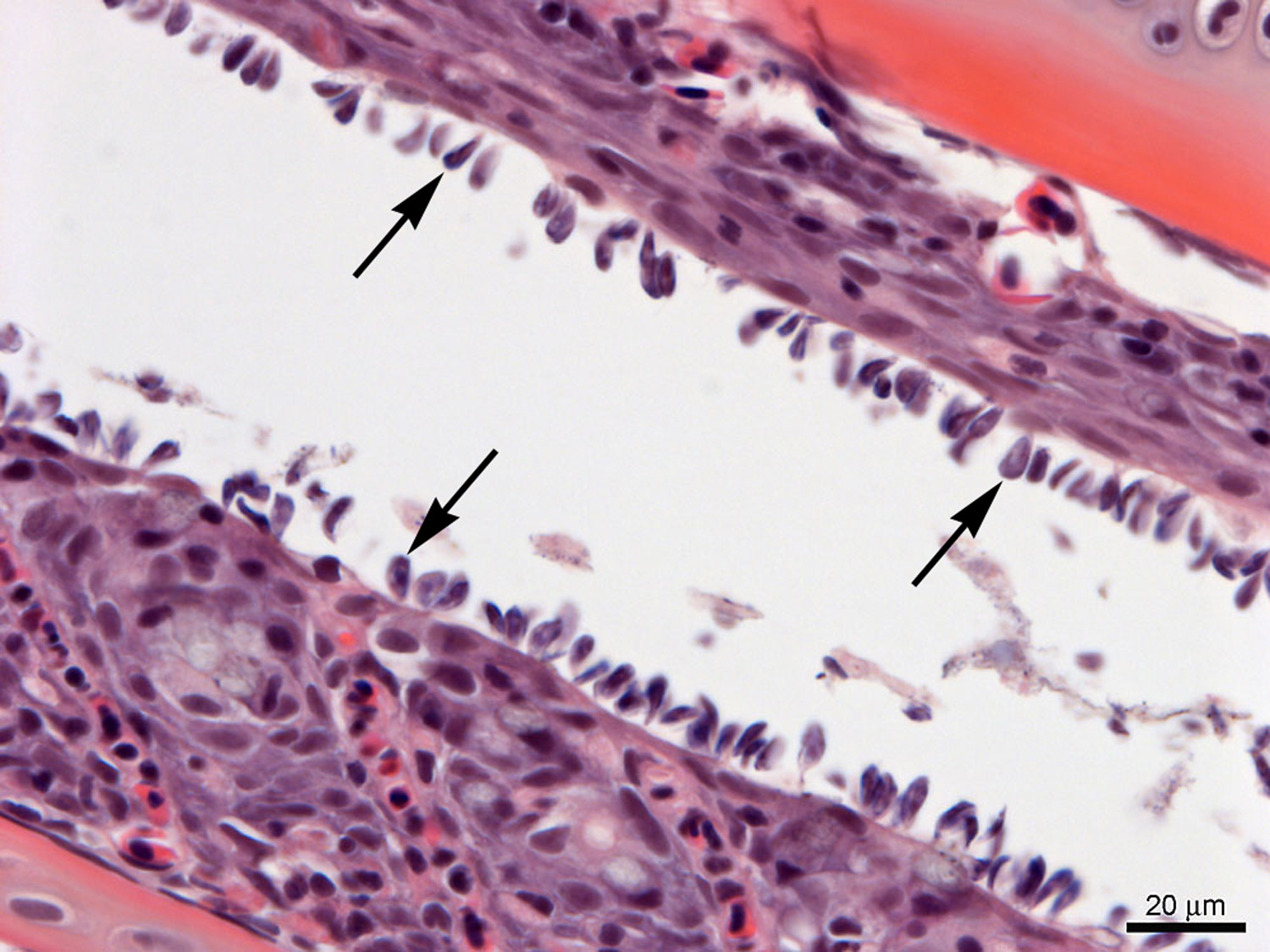
H&E stain of Icthyobodo infected fish gills

=== Diagnosis ===
Diagnosis can be made through microscopy of wet mount preparations of the skin or gills. Icthyobodo species are identified by their small size, biflagellated morphology, and characteristic flickering motility.

Histological examination may show small pear-shaped parasites attached to epithelial surfaces with associated hyperplasia and increased mucous production. Molecular diagnostic methods targeting 18S rRNA sequences and electron microscopy have increasingly been used to distinguish among Icthyobodo species and genotypes.

=== Treatment ===
Formalin is the most effective treatment method.

Metronidazole, secnidazole, and benzimidazole triclabendazole were shown to be 100% effective in treating Ichyobodo necator infection in experimentally infected rainbow trout (Oncorhynchus mykiss).

=== Prevention ===
Maintaining proper water parameters is important in preventing infection as poor water quality has a significant impact the immune system of fish. Water temperatures between 25 °C to 30 °C may help prevent infection, although this may not be possible with some species of fish. Copper supplementation in the water should be avoided if icthyobodosis is of concern, because copper can exacerbate parasite infection by promoting coagulation of the mucous layer.

== History ==
In 1883, French parasitologist Georges-Felix Henneguy was the first to identify the etiologic agent of icthyobodosis in brown trout fry. Henneguy initially called the species Bodo necator. The parasite was later moved to the Genus Costia; however, when it was discovered that the name was already in use, the parasite was reassigned to the genus Icthyobodo, establishing the name Icthyobodo necator.

Several species of Icthyobodo have since been identified. However, only three species have been validly described, all of which are known to cause infections in fish.

Species:

- I. necator
- I. hippoglossi
- I. salmonis
