= Ammonia poisoning =

Domestic aquatic pet disease

Schematic representation of the flow of Nitrogen through a common aquarium.

Ammonia poisoning is a common fish disease in new aquariums, especially when immediately stocked to full capacity. Ideally, the level of ammonia (NH_{3}) and ammonium compounds (i.e. those containing NH_{4}^{+}) in fish tanks should be zero. Although trace amounts are generally harmless, they can still lead to problems over time. Understanding the nitrogen cycle is essential for the keeping of any aquatic life.

The source of ammonia in fish tanks is fish's excretion. Fish excrete ammonia as a nitrogenous waste product. A build-up of ammonia in the fish tank leads to ammonia poisoning. Species of ammonia-oxidizing bacteria (AOB) can break down the ammonia and convert it to other, less toxic, nitrogen products. Two examples of AOB are Nitrosospira and Nitrosomonas.

The amount of ammonia present is usually accompanied by a rise in pH. As ammonia is a base, it is stabilized by acidic water. It can cause damage to the gills at a level as small as 0.25 mg/L.

== Diagnosis ==
A history of the tank, such as filter changes, power outages, excessive feeding, or the addition of microbicidal or antibiotic agents to aquarium can aid in diagnosis. An ammonia test is the most sure way of diagnosing ammonia poisoning.

Ammonia affects fish metabolism and their ability to absorb oxygen through their gills. This leads to a host of symptoms a few of which are:

1. Purple, red or bleeding gills
2. Fish may clamp, may appear darker in color
3. Red streaking on the fins or body
4. Fish may gasp for air at the surface of the tank water
5. Torn and jagged fins
6. Fish may appear weak and lay at the bottom of the tank.

== Prevention ==
The nitrogen cycle in an aquarium.

Ammonia poisoning can be prevented easily by first cycling the tank (see below). Treatments include immediately reducing the ammonia level through many small water changes. Alternatively, a chemical ammonia detoxifier can be used, though such chemicals are best used in only in emergencies and when absolutely necessary, and do not provide a substitute for adequate tank cycling. Once the ammonia is removed, the fish may recover if the damage is not too extensive. Increasing aeration may be desirable, as the fishes' gills are often damaged by ammonia. This can increase the probability of survival slightly. All other sources of stress should also be removed, and the cause of the ammonia should be addressed.

=== Tank cycling ===
Tank cycling is a process during which ammonia reducing bacteria are built up sufficiently to handle the tank bioload. Cycling refers to establishing bacterial colonies that regulate the nitrogen cycle, the conversion of ammonia to nitrite and finally to nitrate. There are two means of cycling a tank: Fish-in cycling whereby the fish produce waste and are the key ammonia source for the cycle, and fishless cycling whereby liquid ammonia solution or decaying fish food is used to fuel the cycle. This process can take anywhere from six to eight weeks.

== See also ==
- Ammonotelic
