= Velvet (fish disease) =

Parasitic disease of fish

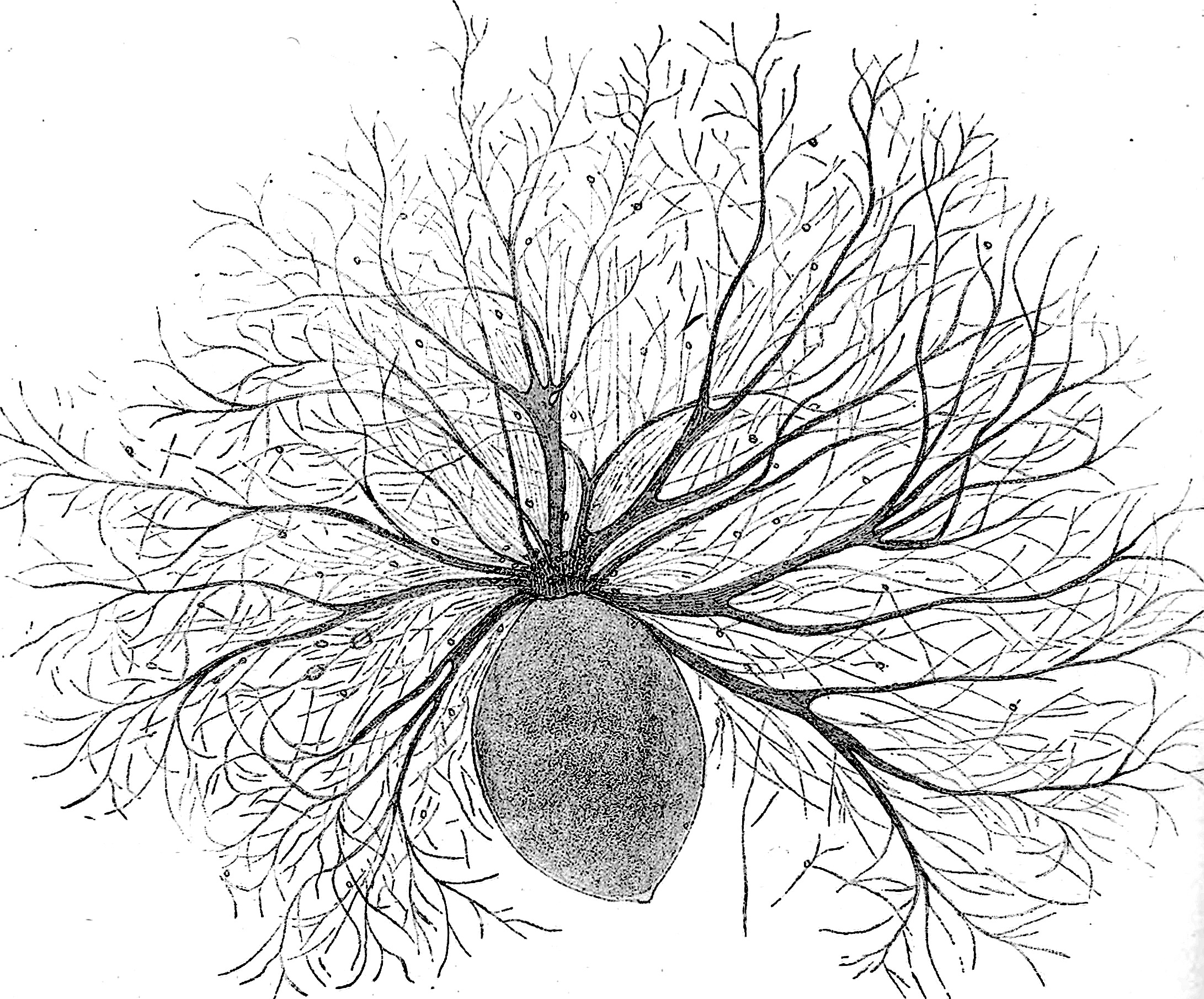
Oodinium, a genus of parasitic dinoflagellates, causes velvet disease in fish

Velvet disease (also called gold-dust, rust and coral disease) is a fish disease caused by dinoflagellate parasites of the genera Amyloodinium in marine fish, and Oodinium in freshwater fish. The disease gives infected organisms a dusty, brownish-gold color. The disease occurs most commonly in tropical fish, and to a lesser extent, marine aquaria. Periodic use of preventive treatments like aquarium salt can further deter parasites. Regular monitoring, attentive care, and preventive measures collectively contribute to keeping fish healthy and velvet-free.

== Life cycle ==
The single-celled parasite's life cycle can be divided into three major phases. First, as a tomont, the parasite rests at the water's floor and divides into as many as 256 tomites. Second, these juvenile, motile tomites swim about in search of a fish host, meanwhile using photosynthesis to grow, and to fuel their search. Finally, the adolescent tomite finds and enters the slime coat of a host fish, dissolving and consuming the host's cells, and needing only three days to reach full maturity before detaching to become a tomont once more.

== Pathology ==
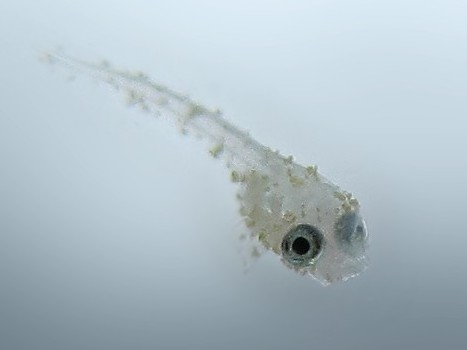
A 15-day-old Siamese fighting fish (Betta splendens) with velvet disease

Velvet (in an aquarium environment) is usually spread by contaminated tanks, fish, and tools (such as nets or testing supplies). There are also rare reports of frozen live foods (such as bloodworms) containing dormant forms of the species. Frequently, however, the parasite is endemic to a fish, and only causes a noticeable "outbreak" after the fish's immune system is compromised for some other reason. The disease is highly contagious and can prove fatal to fish.

== Symptoms ==
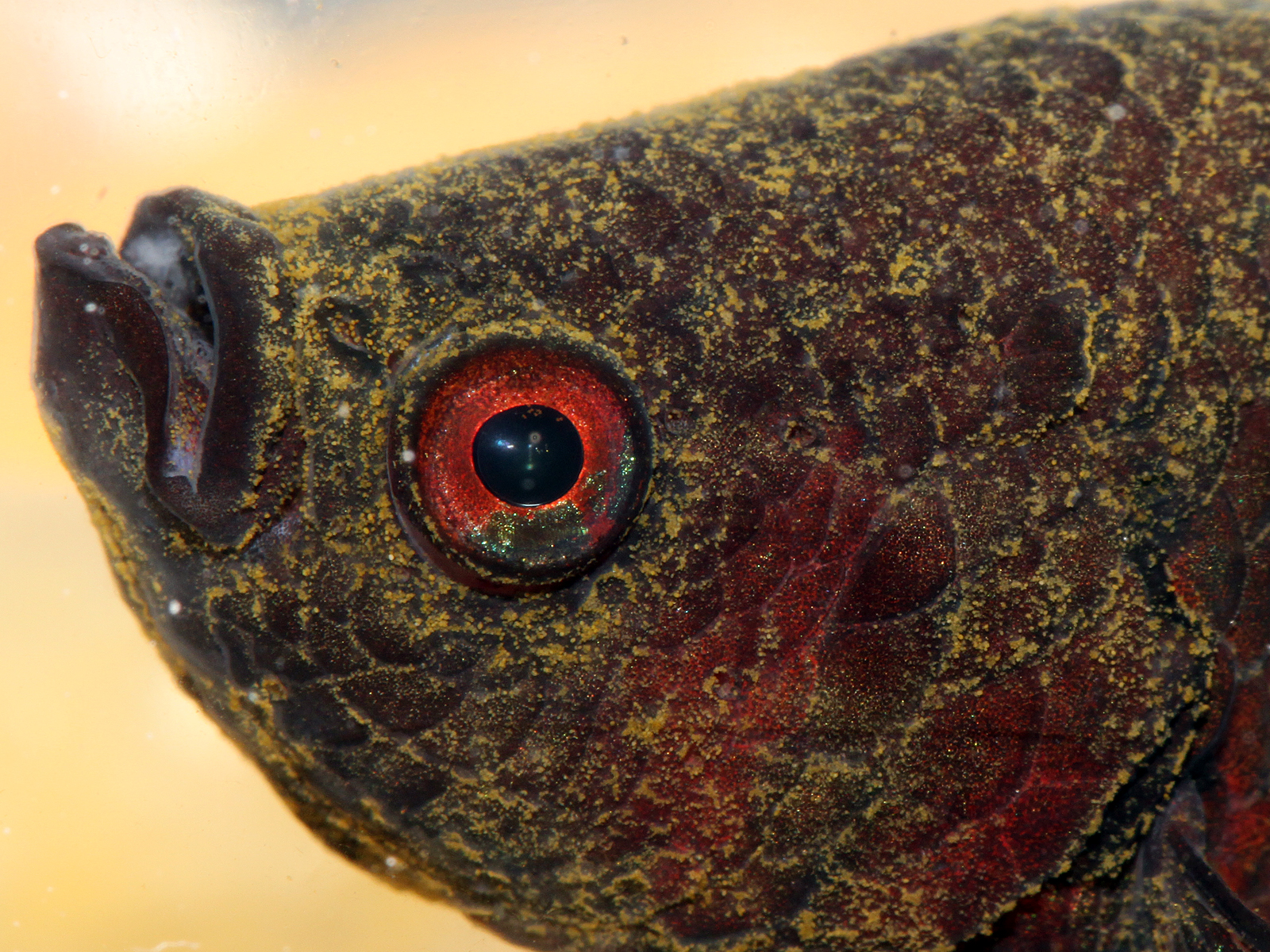
Adult Siamese fighting fish (Betta splendens) with velvet disease

Initially, infected fish are known to "flash", or sporadically dart from one end of an aquarium to another, scratching against objects in order to relieve their discomfort. They will also "clamp" their fins very close to their body, and exhibit lethargy. If untreated, a 'dusting' of particles (which are in fact the parasites) will be seen all over the infected fish, ranging in color from brown to gold to green. In the most advanced stages, fish will have difficulty respiring, will often refuse food, and will eventually die of hypoxia due to necrosis of their gill tissue.

== Treatment ==
Sodium chloride (table/sea salt) is believed to mitigate the reproduction of velvet in freshwater fish, however this treatment is not itself sufficient for the complete eradication of an outbreak. Additionally, one of the common medications designed to combat the disease must be added directly to the fish's environment. These medications usually include the active ingredients copper sulfate, methylene blue, formalin, malachite green or acriflavin. Additionally, because velvet parasites derive a portion of their energy from photosynthesis, leaving a tank in total darkness for seven days provides a helpful supplement to chemical curatives. Finally, some enthusiasts recommend raising the water temperature of an infected fish's environment, in order to quicken the life cycle (and subsequent death) of velvet parasites; however this tactic is not practical for all fish, and may induce immunocompromising stress.

== See also ==
- Pfiesteria piscicida
