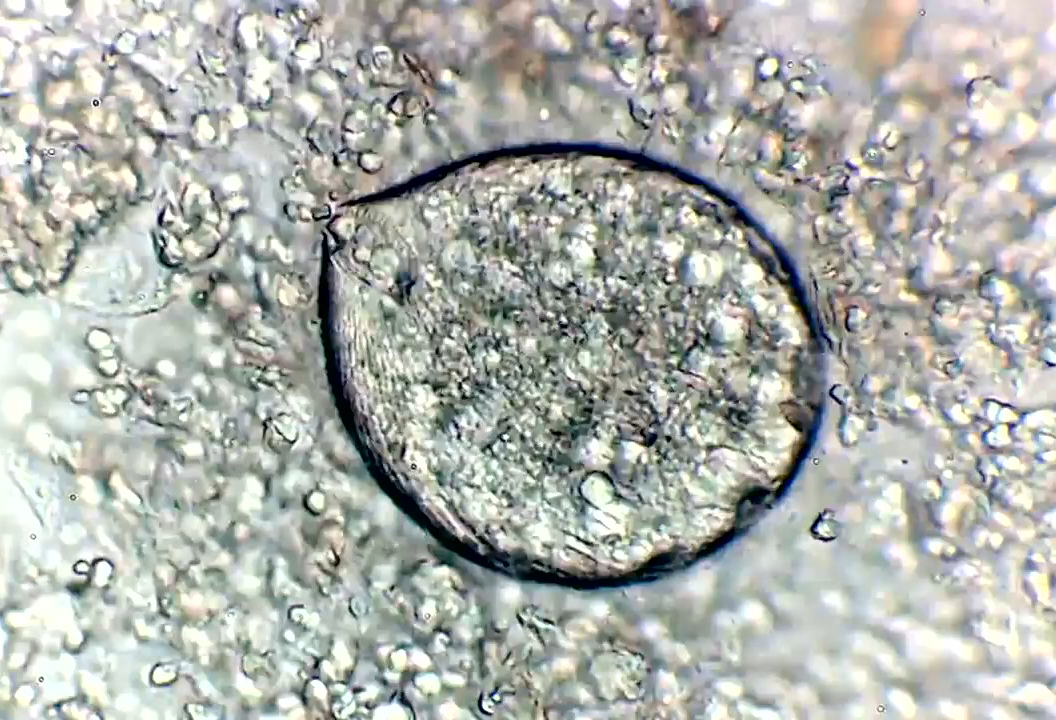
- Image of the parasite
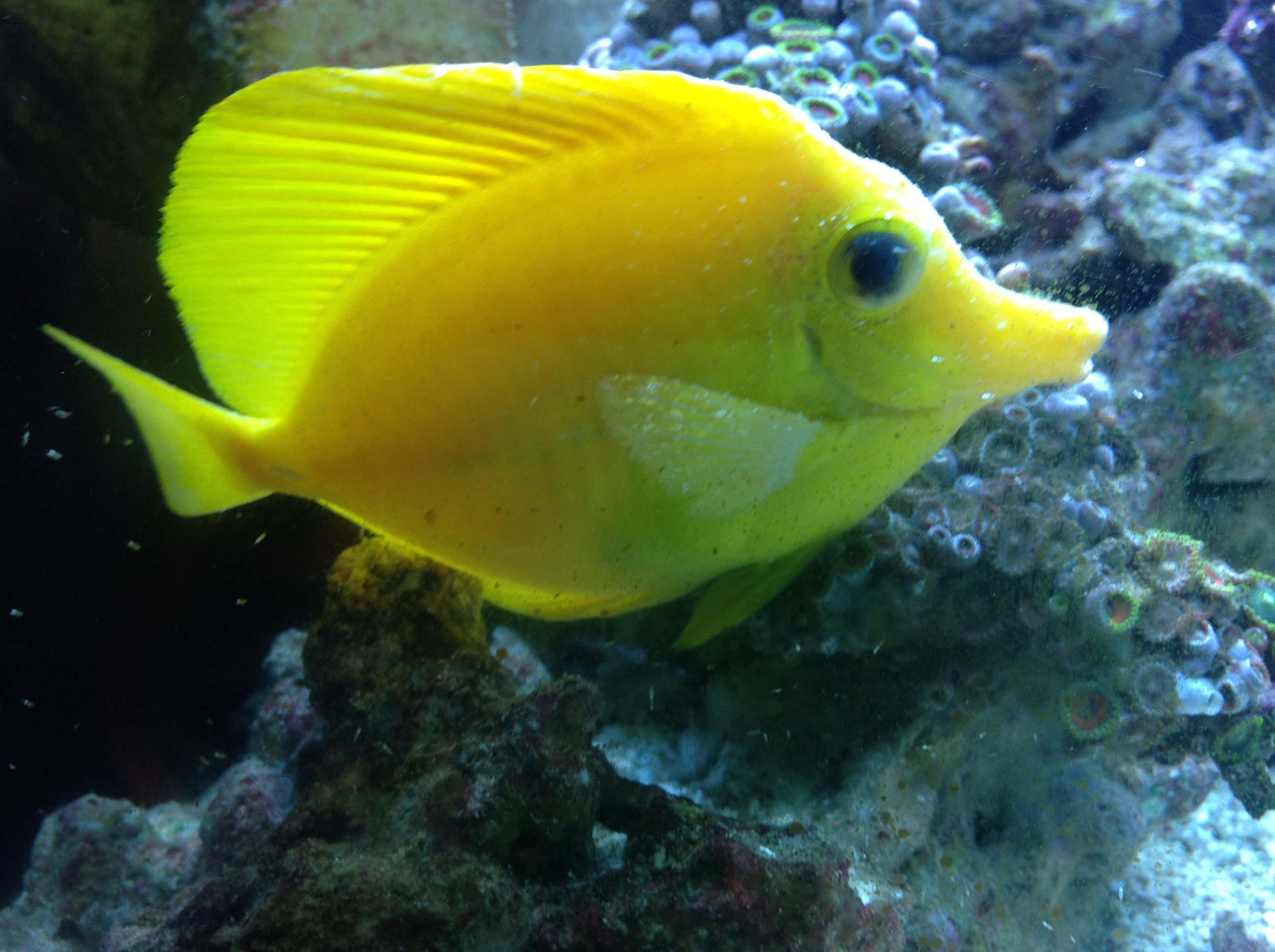
- Yellow tang with white spots characteristic of marine ich

Scientific classification
- Domain: Eukaryota
- Supergroup: Alveolata
- Phylum: Ciliophora
- Class: Prostomatea
- Order: Prorodontida
- Family: Holophryidae
- Genus: Cryptocaryon; Brown, 1951
- Species: C. irritans

Binomial name
- Cryptocaryon irritans Brown, 1951

= Cryptocaryon =

Genus of single-celled organisms

Cryptocaryon irritans is a species of ciliate that parasitizes marine fish, causing marine white spot disease or marine ich (pronounced ick). It is one of the most common causes of disease in marine aquaria.

== Taxonomy ==
Cryptocaryon irritans was originally classified as Ichthyophthirius marinus, but it is not closely related to the other species. It belongs to the class Prostomatea, but beyond that its placement is still uncertain.

== Clinical ==
The symptoms and life cycle are generally similar to those of Ichthyophthirius in freshwater fish, including white spots, on account of which Cryptocaryon is usually called marine ich. However, Cryptocaryon can spend a much longer time encysted. Fish that are infected with Cryptocaryon may present with small white spots, nodules, or patches on their skin, fins, or gills. In some cases the parasite may attach on the gills of the fish, making it much harder to see. They may also have ragged fins, cloudy eyes, pale gills, increased mucus production, or changes in skin colour, and they may appear thin. Behavioural changes may be observed, such as scratching, abnormal swimming, lethargy, hanging at the surface or bottom of the tank, or breathing rapidly as if in distress.

=== Life cycle ===
C. irritans has a 4-stage life cycle, consisting of a trophon stage, a protomont stage, a tomont stage, and a theront stage. The characteristic white spots occur in the trophont stage, where C. irritans finds a host fish to attach to. This is where the parasite begins feeding on the host fish for 3–9 days. After this, C. irritans falls off the host and enters the protomont stage. The free-swimming parasite now find substrate such as rocks or sand to attach to. Once it has achieved this, the parasite enters the tomont stage and begins to reproduce asexually, this may last from 3 to 72 days. Lastly, the parasite enters the theront stage, where it once again becomes free-swimming. Here, it searches for a new host to attach to and begins the cycle anew.

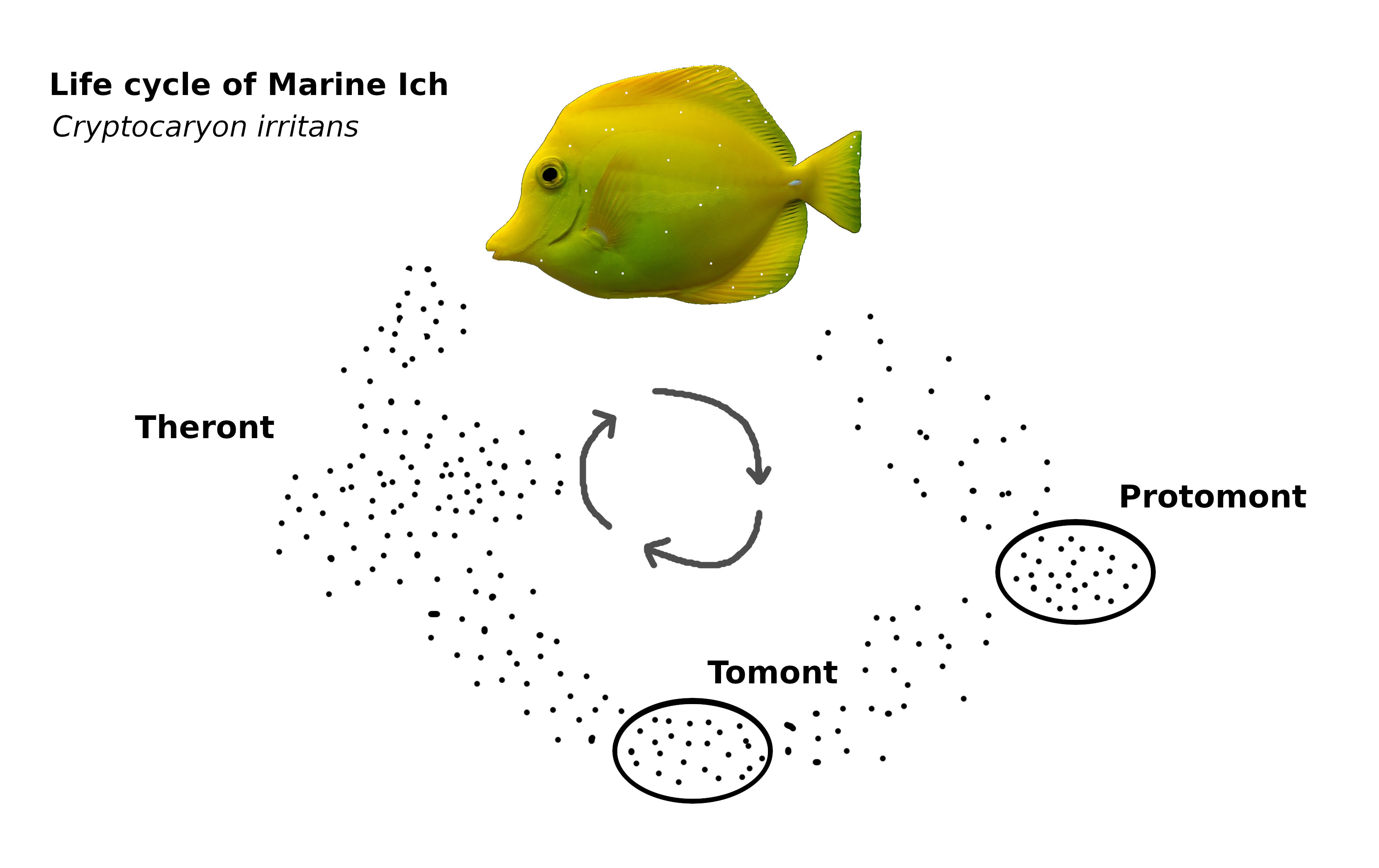
A diagram showing the life cycle of marine ich (Cryptocaryon irritans) infecting a fish

=== Treatment ===
Due to this extensive life cycle, marine ich can be difficult to treat. Especially as most available treatments are not safe for corals, snails and other invertebrates. This usually forces the aquarist to quarantine the infected fish in a separate tank for the duration of the treatment.

Useful treatments (but not safe for reef tanks or invertebrates) of C. irritans include copper solutions, formalin solutions and quinine-based drugs (such as chloroquine phosphate and quinine diphosphate) or hyposalinity (at 1.009 specific gravity).

Another treatment option called the tank transfer method involves moving the affected fish to another tank at specific times in the parasite's life cycle, intending for the parasite to "drop off" the fish in a separate, quarantined tank and moving the fish back to its original tank before the parasite is able to reattach.

==== Ich management ====
Because ich can be extremely hard to eradicate in marine aquaria, so-called "ich management" has become an alternative approach to dealing with this parasite. Rather than going through the time and labour intensive treatment or quarantine process, aquarists may choose to instead manage ich by allowing the fish to fight off the parasites on their own. Through a combination of a healthy, varied diet, and good water quality, the symptoms of ich may be minimal on the fish and may even be easier on the fish than moving it to a new environment in a quarantine tank. As marine ich is not always a deadly parasite, this method offers an alluring premise compared to the labour intensive ich-eradication strategy. Critics, such as Bobby Miller from Humble Fish, have warned against this method, saying "All it takes is one 'stressor event' to undo years of ich management." indicating how delicate and precarious this approach is.

== See also ==
- Freshwater ich for the similar disease of freshwater fishes
