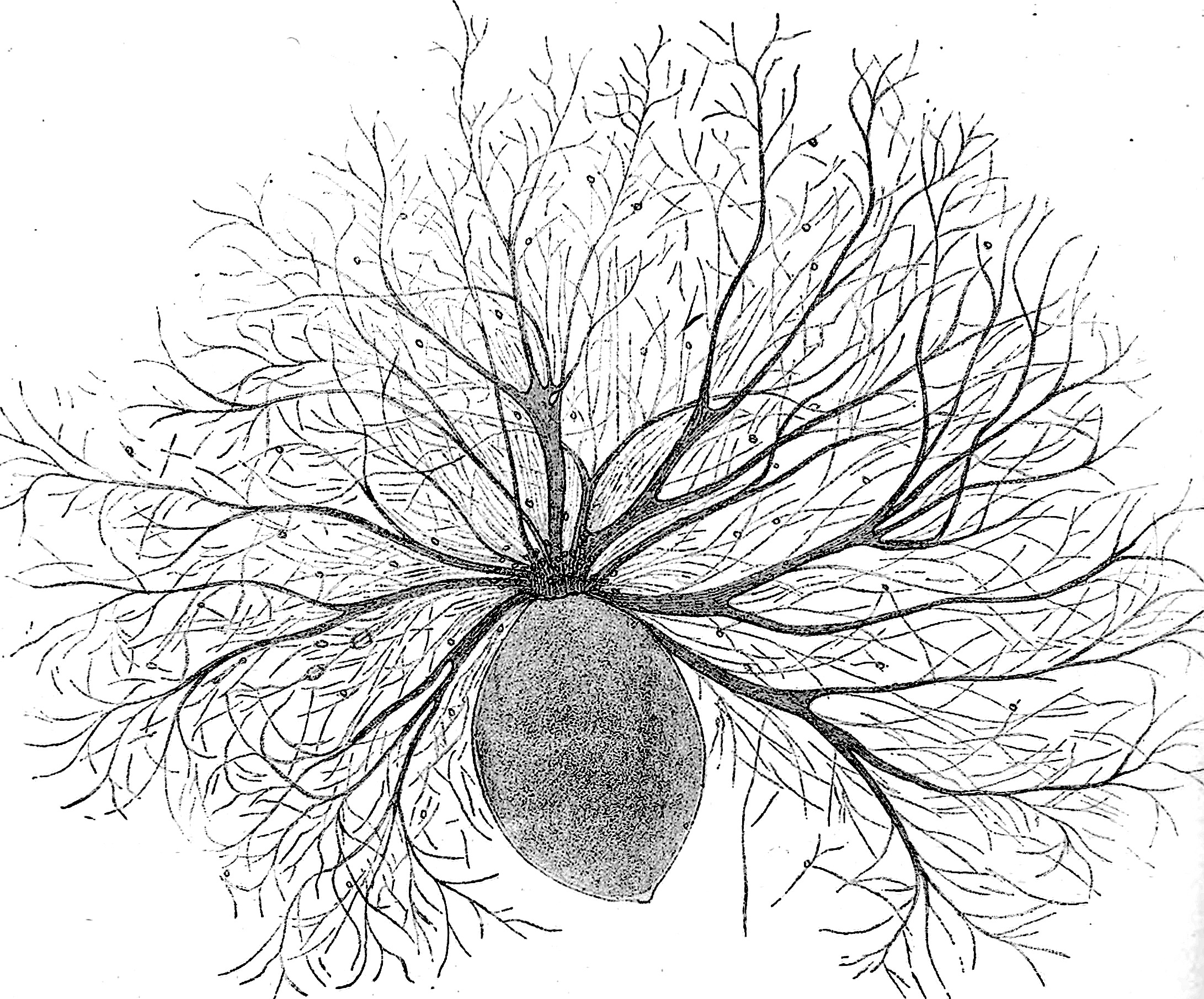
- Oodinium amylaceum

Scientific classification
- Domain: Eukaryota
- Clade: Sar
- Clade: Alveolata
- Division: Dinoflagellata
- Class: Dinophyceae
- Order: Blastodiniales
- Family: Oodiniaceae
- Genus: Oodinium; Chatton, 1912

Species
- Oodinium limneticum Oodinium pillularis Oodinium pouchetii

= Oodinium =

Genus of single-celled organisms

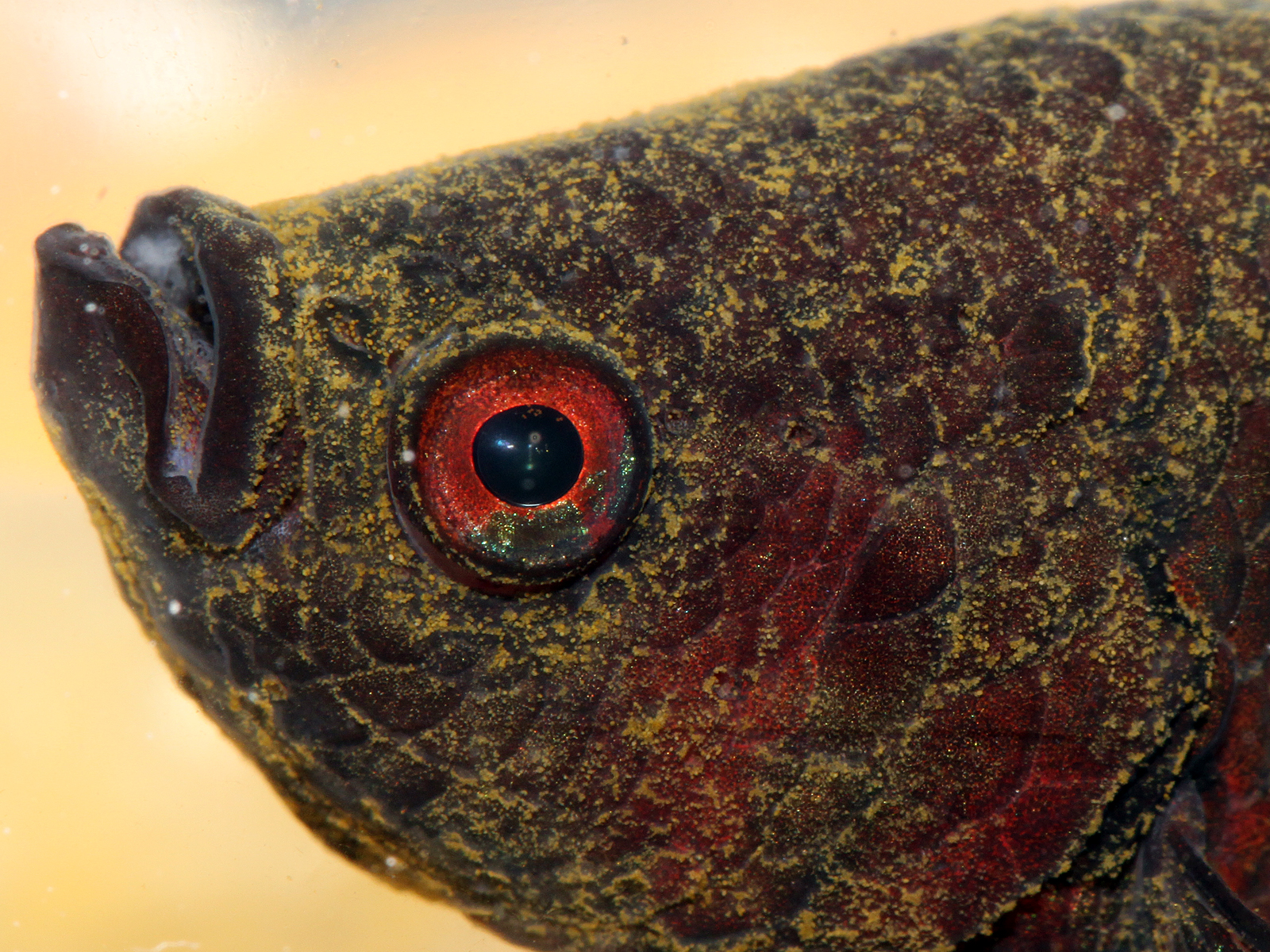
Adult Siamese fighting fish (Betta splendens) with velvet disease

Oodinium is a genus of parasitic dinoflagellates. Their hosts are salt- and fresh-water fish, causing a type of fish velvet disease (also called gold dust disease). One species has also been recorded on various cnidarians.

The host typically develops a yellow or gold "dust" scattered on its head, fins and body. At this stage, the infestation is already severe. The attack usually starts at the gills, at which stage it is difficult to observe. The host fish is irritated, and often sporadically darts about or rubs itself against rocks. The yellowish spots are more vivid under a strong light source. It is very similar to Ichthyophthirius, though the oodinium spots are yellowish and smaller.

The life cycle of oodinium starts as a dinospore that swims in the water to look for a suitable host. As it attaches itself onto the host skin, it forms a hard shell protecting itself against the outside environment while it is eating the fish skin cells. This is the cyst stage seen as dust covering the fish skin. After few days, the cyst sinks to the bottom, freeing a new generation of dinospores. As the cycle repeats, the dinospore must find a host within 48 hours or else die.

Treatment is possible by diluting the commercially available copper salts. Free swimming dinospores are extremely vulnerable to copper compounds. Bringing the water temperature to 30°C helps to release the dinospore from the cyst.

== See also ==
- Pfiesteria
