= Dropsy in fish =

Condition caused by the buildup of fluid inside the body

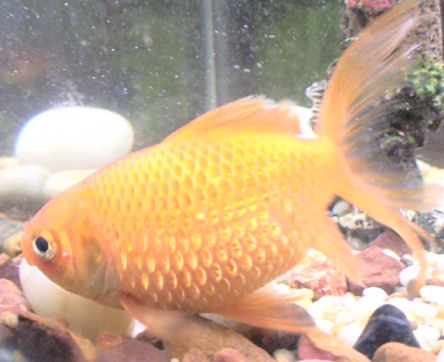
A goldfish with dropsy

Dropsy is a condition in fish caused by the buildup of fluid inside the body cavity or tissues. As a symptom rather than a disease in its own right, it can indicate a number of underlying diseases, including bacterial infections, parasitic infections, or liver dysfunction.

== Causes ==
The symptoms collectively known as “dropsy” may be caused by a multitude of reasons. Poor water quality, viral infections, sudden changes in water conditions and a prolonged period of stress that may compromise the fish’s immune system may all trigger said symptoms.

== Prognosis ==
By the time a disorder reaches the point of causing dropsy, it can often be fatal and at the very least the fish is very ill and requires immediate quarantine and treatment.

== Symptoms ==
The following symptoms may be observed:

- Swelling of the abdomen
- Eyes that are beginning to swell and bulge
- Scales that flare outwards instead of lying flat against the fish's body, giving a "pine cone"-like appearance
- A loss of color in their gills
- Clamping of the fins
- A curve developing in their spine
- Pale feces
- Swelling near their anus
- A loss of appetite
- A lack of energy and movement

== Treatment ==
Because dropsy is a symptom of an illness, its cause may or may not be contagious. However, it is standard practice to quarantine sick fish to prevent spreading the underlying cause to the other fish in the tank community in case the disease causing dropsy is contagious. However, this quarantine is only effective when the disease is caught early.

Traditionally, when fish would exhibit dropsy, it was advised to “destroy” it. However recently, it is recommended to “bathe” the fish in water that has aquarium or epsom salts dissolved in it, as the process of osmosis may help relieve pressure on the fish. Antibiotics may destroy or weaken the pathogen if it is bacterial so that the immune system of the fish is capable of overcoming the underlying disease.
