= Head and lateral line erosion =

Disease of fish

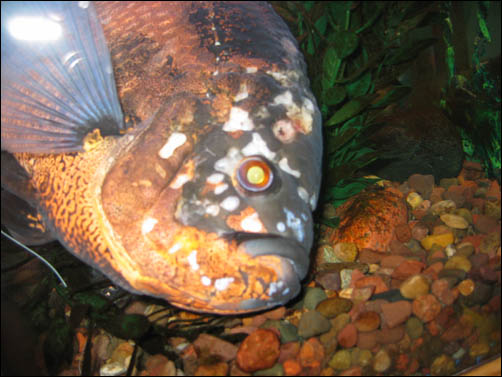
A red oscar that has died while showing HLLE

Head and lateral line erosion, (HLLE) or hole-in-the-head (HITH) is a disease in fish. Chronic ulcerative dermatopathy or chronic erosive dermatopathy are symptoms of similar conditions with different etiology.

== Symptoms ==
HLLE begins as small pits of receding epithelium (skin) around the fish's head and/or lateral line, and sometimes onto the unpaired fins. Rarely fatal, it does cause disfigurement, making the fish less suitable for public aquarium display. At least 20 families of fish have been identified as having developed HLLE in captivity. Not all species of fish show the same symptoms, and do not always develop lesions to the same degree.

== Causes ==
HLLE has not been sufficiently studied to identify all causes. In marine fish, two studies point to the use of activated carbon in closed aquarium ecosystems as contributors.

== Cure ==
Hole in the head may be reversed by conducting large-percentage water changes, greater than 90%. More commonly, cures are made by moving the fish to a new aquarium that has never had fish develop HLLE in it.

Cases of Head & Lateral Line Erosion

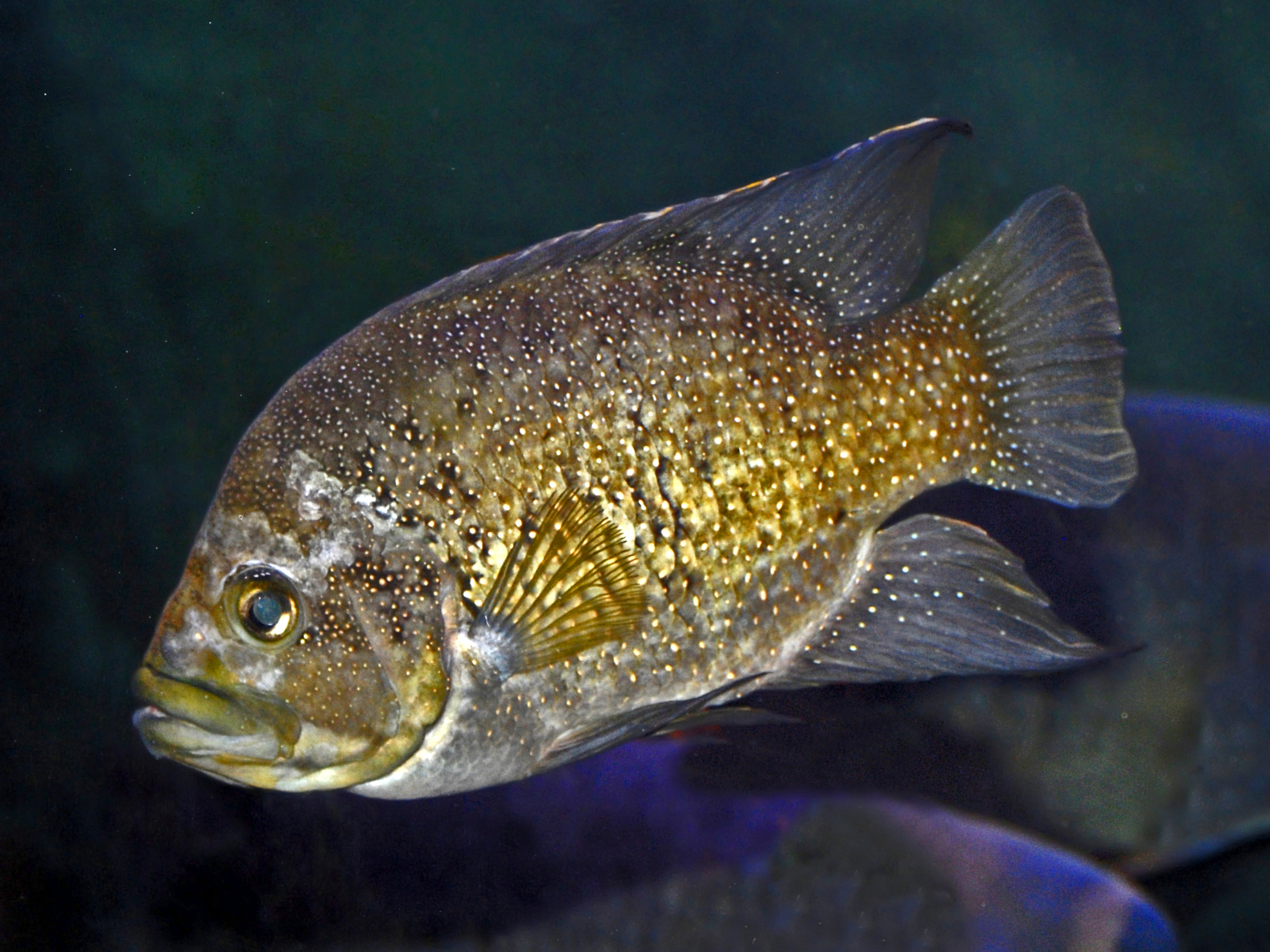
Head lesions are visible on this starry-night cichlid

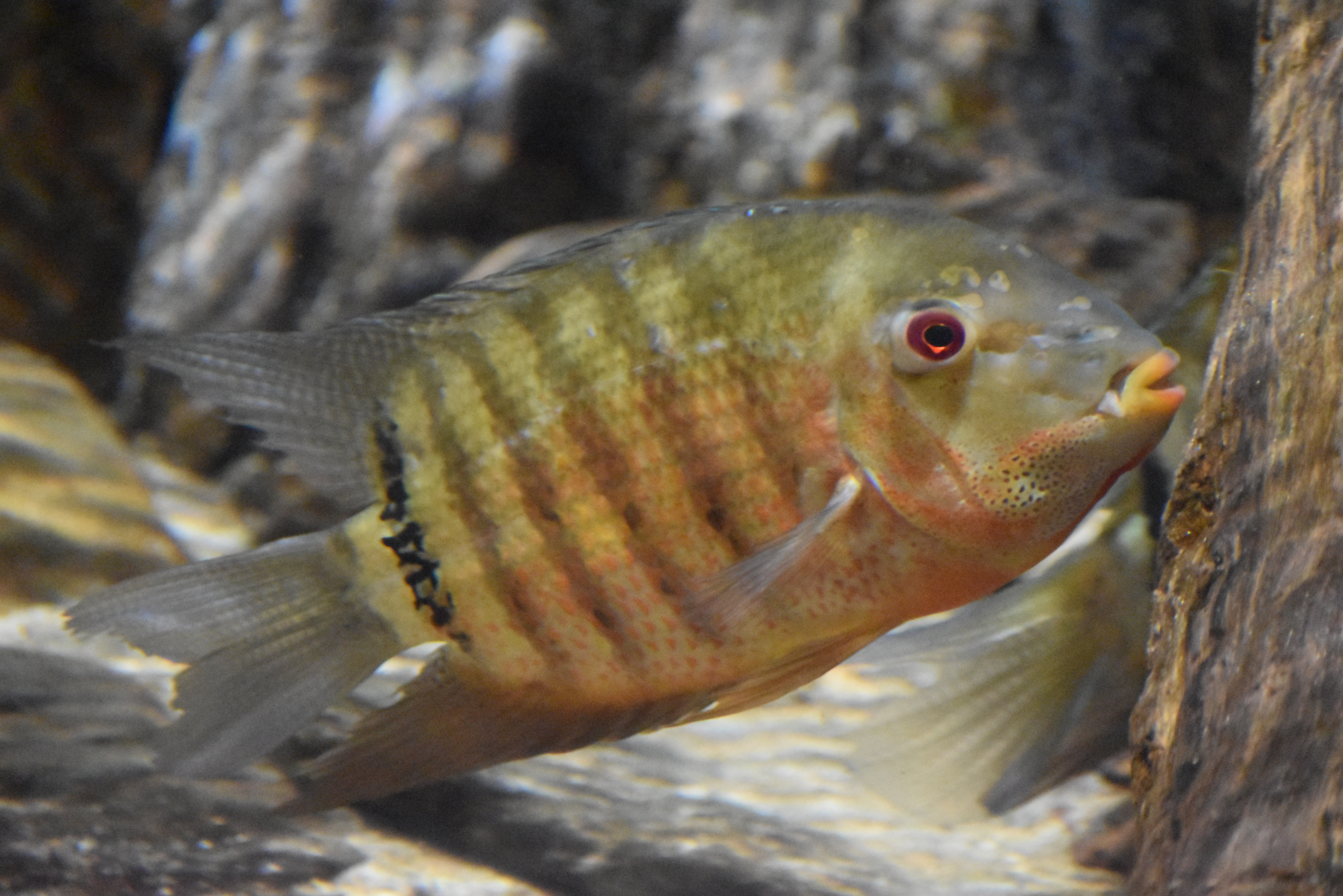
Severum

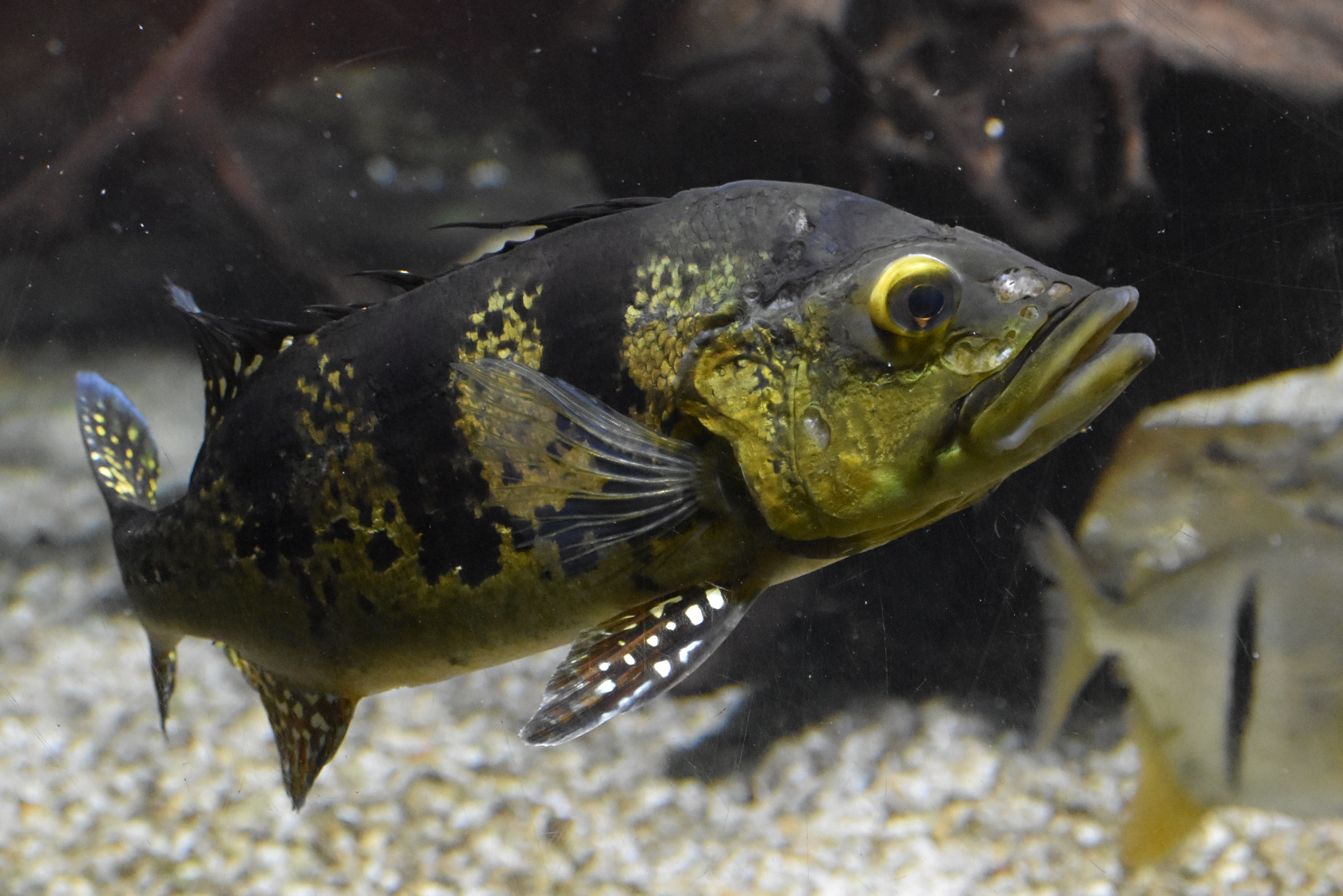
Peacock bass

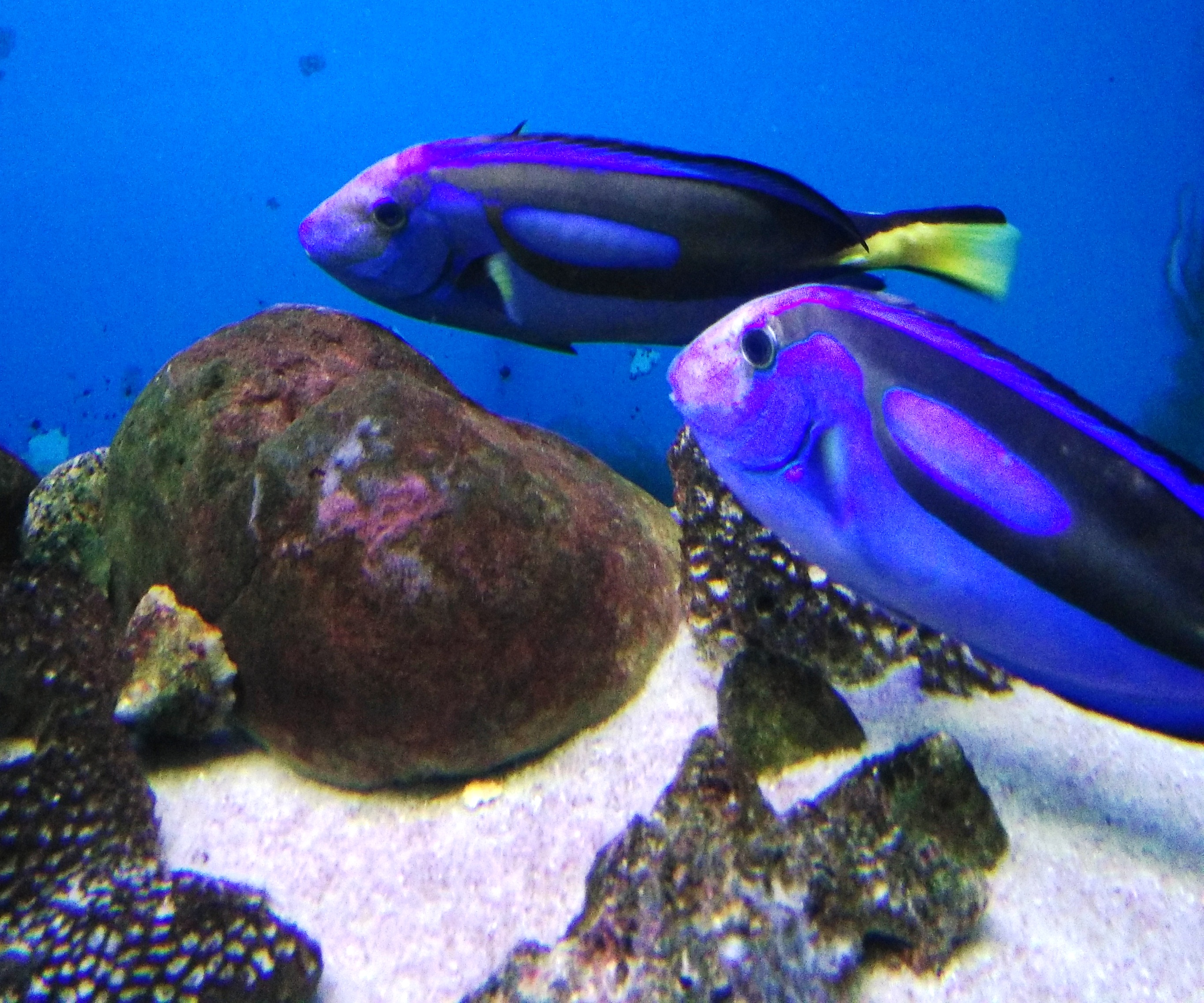
Blue tangs

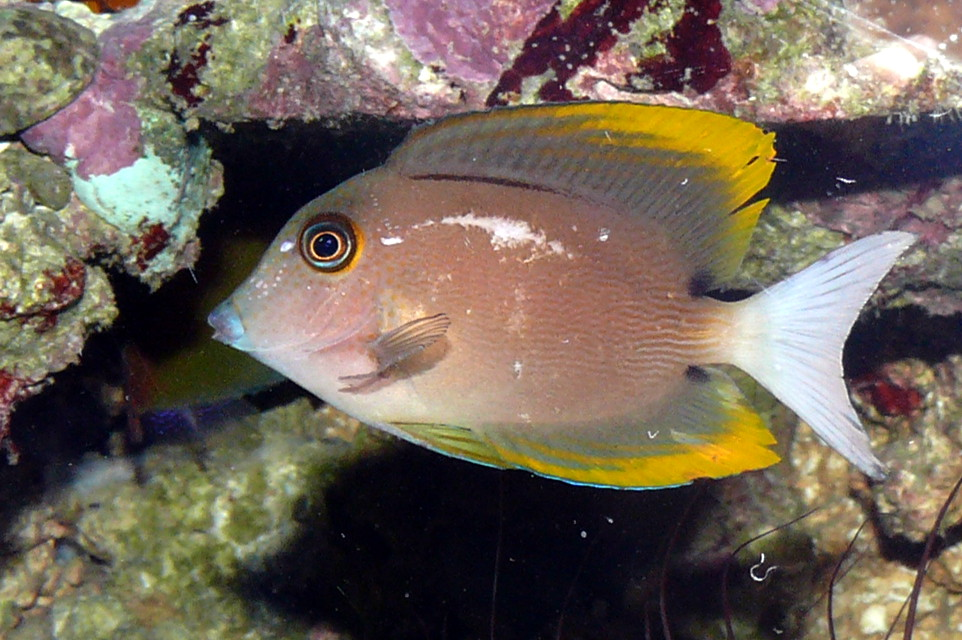
Tomini bristletooth
