= Streptococcosis =

Group of diseases

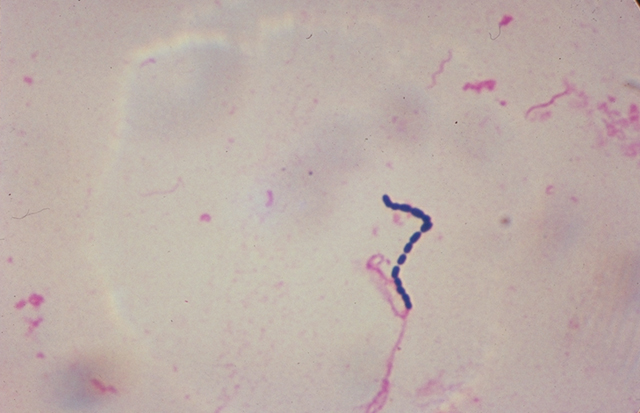

Streptococcosis is an infectious disease caused by bacteria of the genus Streptococcus. This disease is most common among horses, guinea pigs, dogs, cats, and fish with symptoms varying based on the streptococcal species involved. In humans, this disease typically involves a throat infection and is called streptococcal pharyngitis or strep throat.

== Pathogenesis ==
Occurring in pairs or chains, streptococci are found to be Gram-positive (although older cultures may lose this characteristic), non-mobile, non-spore forming, and catalase-negative. Bacteriophages, also known as phages, of streptococcus within different parameters of temperature, pH, and salinity maintain successfully stable and are lytic. Integrase, transposase, and recombinase coding genes are found to be absent within phages. Streptococcosis can start occurring due to a weak immune system, or by having bacteria enter wounds. Spreading of Streptococcus is often sporadic, and can be done through direct contact (may be done through materials that are likely to carry infection), air transport or (rarely) ingestion.

== Classification ==
The bacterial species involved in a streptococcosis infection is typically identified through microscopy of the bacteria to observe their morphology, biochemical tests (e.g., hemolysis ability), and tests on which antibodies are produced by the infected organism. Antibody detection, also known as serologic grouping, categorizes with the labeling of Group A to Group V; it uses differences with cell wall carbohydrates and pili-associated protein. With the use of hemolysis, species are divided within three different categories: incomplete (α hemolytic), complete (β-hemolytic), and no (γ hemolytic) hemolysis detected. Two common species seen are S. agalactiae which has been associated with fish and (more significant) S. suis which has been associated with pigs.

== Clinical identification ==
The clinical manifestations of streptococcus infections differ greatly depending on both the host species and group and strain of the bacteria.

=== Alpha-hemolytic streptococci (S. pneumoniae and viridians) ===
The first group of streptococci is alpha-hemolytic which comprises primarily S.pneumoniae and viridans streptococci. This group is referred to as alpha-hemolysis because the cell membrane of red blood cells is left intact. When cultured, alpha-hemolysis can be deemed present when the agar gel appears greenish.

Identifying and diagnosing alpha-hemolytic Streptococcus is done with a sputum gram stain and culture test. Further identification can be done serologically to test for the presence of capsular antigen, which is the dominant structure on the surface of S. pneumoniae. Bile solubility can be used to further distinguish S. pneumoniae from viridans streptococci as S. pneumoniae are bile soluble and viridans streptococci are not.

S. pneumoniae are the most significant alpha-hemolytic streptococci and are responsible for several infections including:

- Lower respiratory tract infection
- Pneumonia
- Septicaemia
- Meningitis
- Septic arthritis
- Sinusitis

The identification and diagnosis of these conditions often require a combination of bacteriologic methods with other clinical identification characteristics that are condition-specific.

=== Beta-hemolytic streptococci (Group A, B, C, D, F, G, and H) ===
In contrast, the beta-hemolytic group of streptococci includes those capable of complete lysis of red blood cells. Beta-hemolytic streptococci are further divided into additional subgroups consisting of: Group A, Group B, Group C, Group D, Group F, Group G, and Group H. Beta-hemolysis is identified by its yellow and transparent appearance on the cultured media.

Clinical identification of beta-hemolytic streptococci relies on culturing the bacteria with agar media that has been supplemented with blood. This method allows for beta-hemolysis to be easily identified, which is a critical step in further identification tactics. Identification into subgroups can be done by the Lancefield antigen-determination test which uses antibodies to distinguish B-hemolytic streptococci into different species. An additional method used to identify B-hemolytic streptococci is the PYR test, which is primarily used in distinguishing S. pyogenes from other B-hemolytic strains by testing for the presence of pyrrolidonyl aminopeptidase. Both the Lancefield antigen grouping sera and PYR test are widely available for commercial usage. Each method presents its limitations and studies suggest that a combination of the two protocols be used to achieve the most reliable results.

==== Group A ====
Group A streptococcal infections are predominantly caused by S. pyogenes. Human pathologies are mostly associated with Group A streptococci and arise most often as respiratory or skin infections.

Group A streptococcal infections include:

- Streptococcal pharyngitis
- Impetigo
- Necrotizing fasciitis
- Cellulitis
- Streptococcal toxic shock syndrome
- Rheumatic fever
- Post-streptococcal glomerulonephritis

The identification and diagnosis of these conditions often require a combination of bacteriologic methods with other clinical identification characteristics that are condition-specific.

==== Group B ====
Group B streptococcal infections, most commonly associated with S. agalactiae, are extremely prevalent among pregnant women, newborns, and the elderly. Cattle have also been shown to be important reservoir hosts for S. agalactiae. Reports of S. agalactiae have also been identified in several other mammals, fish, and reptiles.

== Economic impacts and considerations ==
Streptococcosis has been shown to have serious consequences on Aquaculture industries around the world as a result of various streptococcal-based infections in marine and freshwater organisms. Streptococosis in fish specifically has proven to be a public health concern due to the zoonotic capabilities of streptococcal infections and diseases. Mitigating streptococcosis in marine and freshwater organisms, has the potential to improve the economics of the aquaculture sector and decrease the risks of human illness.

Traditionally, antibiotics and other chemotherapeutic drugs have been used to combat streptococcosis infections in aquaculture settings. However, re-infection rates, drugs accumulating in aquatic ecosystems, demand for chemical-free aquaculture products, and the diversity of species and strains within the Streptococcus genus has proven to be a major challenge. Since re-infection rates among fish populations are high, multiple treatments are often needed which introduces an additional problem of increased antibiotic resistance. In search of alternative solutions, current research is investigating the possibility of using dietary supplements or medicinal herbs and other plants as alternatives to antibiotics, and recent findings have generated promising results.

The existing literature has placed a strong emphasis on the economic impacts of streptococcosis in tilapia cultures. Tilapia have rapid growth rates, exhibit tolerance to numerous environmental conditions, and are available globally which causes the species to be of major importance in the global aquaculture sector. Tilapia production is often conducted by large-scale producers in intensive systems, which increases their susceptibility to disease and infection due to the density of cultures and subsequent water quality issues. Streptococcosis has been identified as the most important pathogen affecting these systems and has caused considerable economic losses to the industry. In general, preventing disease and infection should be a priority compared to simply controlling and mitigating outbreaks. Research acknowledges that disease prevention may be possible by utilizing effective biosecurity measures at both global and local levels. In addition, recent studies have found several benefits of using medicinal herbs to treat streptococcosis in aquaculture. Studies suggest that a combination of vaccines, antibiotics, and phytotherapy may be the most viable solution to improve both the economics of the industry and mitigate public health concerns. Considerations and adjustments will have to made depending on national regulations, the countries economic status, and the farms production capacity.

== Epidemiology ==
=== Host range ===
Streptococcosis encompasses a spectrum of diseases caused by bacteria from the genera Streptococcus and Lactococcus. Various species within these genera can cause infections in both wild and cultured animals, including fish and terrestrial species.

Commonly affected organisms include:

Fish species: Streptococcus iniae, Streptococcus agalactiae, Streptococcus dysgalactiae, Lactococcus garvieae, Lactococccus piscium, and Streptococcus parauberis have a significant impact in aquaculture, impacting freshwater, marine, and brackish water species. Among these L. garvieae, S. iniae, and S. parauberis are considered the primary causative agents responsible for diseases in marine aquaculture among the streptococcal bacteria affecting fish.

Terrestrial animals: Streptococcus agalactiae, commonly found in cattle and dromedary camels, has been detected in numerous species, including small ruminants, llamas, horses, and marine mammals, often associated with human sources. Streptococcus dysgalactiae primarily infects cattle but also affects small ruminants, pigs, dogs, horses, and vampire bats. Streptococcus equi subsp. zooepidemicus, prevalent in horses, is also present in guinea pigs, pigs, monkeys, and various other animals, including dogs, cats, ferrets, and birds. Additionally, Streptococcus suis mainly affects suids but can be found in other animals like cattle, sheep, goats, and chickens, with different genotypes found in rabbits and chickens compared to pigs.

Humans: Streptococcal infections in humans are primarily caused by Streptococcus pyogenes, the most common beta-hemolytic group A streptococcus, often referred to simply as group A streptococcus. Similarly, group B streptococcus typically denotes Streptococcus agalactiae, although minor beta-hemolytic group B streptococci like S. troglodytidis exist. While most streptococcal illnesses in humans originate from species adapted to humans, such as S. pneumoniae or S. pyogenes, there are zoonotic species capable of causing infections. These include S. canis, S. dysgalactiae subsp. dysgalactiae, S. equi subsp. zooepidemicus, S. halichoeri, S. iniae, and S. suis, along with some animal-associated genotypes of S. agalactiae. Notably, some streptococci found in animals may infect humans under certain circumstances. Fish-associated S. agalactiae, primarily affecting farmed freshwater and marine fish, have also been implicated in human illnesses, particularly the ST283 genotype. The prevalence of specific S. suis serotypes varies by region, impacting disease incidence in both pigs and humans.

=== Transmission routes ===
Members of the Streptococcus genus are frequently found as part of the normal microbial community in both animals and humans, commonly inhabiting sites such as the upper respiratory tract, urogenital tract, mucous membranes, mammary glands, or skin. While these organisms can occasionally cause infections as primary pathogens, they more commonly act as opportunistic pathogens, particularly in carriers. However, their transmission between hosts does not always lead to disease manifestation. Streptococci are typically transmitted through close contact, though aerosols may sometimes play a role. Some species, such as S. suis, S. equi subsp. zooepidemicus, and S. agalactiae ST283, can be acquired through the consumption of undercooked pork, horsemeat, or fish, respectively, or via unpasteurized dairy products. S. iniae infections in humans often occur through skin abrasions during fish cleaning. The mode of transmission among fish is not fully elucidated but can occur orally or through exposure to contaminated water baths, particularly in laboratory settings. Streptococci can also be transmitted through fomites and can persist in the environment for varying durations, especially in organic material under moist, cool conditions. For instance, S. suis can remain viable for approximately a week in pig feces at 25 °C (77 °F) and up to six weeks in carcasses at 4 °C (39 °F).

=== Geographic distribution ===
The strains of Streptococcus, including S. canis, S. dysgalactiae subsp. dysgalactiae, S. equi subsp. zooepidemicus, S. suis, and mammalian S. agalactiae, maintained in domestic animals are widely distributed and their presence follows the hosts that they reside in. Regional variations in the predominant serotypes of S. suis may impact disease prevalence in both pigs and humans. S. iniae infections have predominantly been documented in regions such as North America, the Caribbean, parts of Asia (such as Japan, China, Singapore, and Taiwan), Australia, and the Middle East. Meanwhile, occurrences of S. halichoeri have been reported in certain parts of Europe and South Korea, with potential wider distribution. Notably, S. agalactiae ST283 appears to be primarily found in Asia but has recently been identified in farmed fish in South America.
