= Kudoa gunterae =

Scientific classification
- Kingdom: Animalia
- Phylum: Cnidaria
- Class: Myxosporea
- Order: Multivalvulida
- Family: Kudoidae
- Genus: Kudoa
- Species: K. gunterae

Binomial name
- Kudoa gunterae Burger & Adlard, 2009

Species of marine parasite

Kudoa gunterae is a myxosporean parasite of marine fishes, first discovered in Australia from 10 pomacentrid species and 1 apogonid species.
