= Kudoa whippsi =

Scientific classification
- Kingdom: Animalia
- Phylum: Cnidaria
- Class: Myxosporea
- Order: Multivalvulida
- Family: Kudoidae
- Genus: Kudoa
- Species: K. whippsi

Binomial name
- Kudoa whippsi Burger & Adlard, 2009

Parasite

Kudoa whippsi is a myxosporean parasite of marine fishes, first discovered in Australia from 8 pomacentrid species and 1 apogonid species.
