= Kudoa konishiae =

Scientific classification
- Kingdom: Animalia
- Phylum: Cnidaria
- Class: Myxosporea
- Order: Multivalvulida
- Family: Kudoidae
- Genus: Kudoa
- Species: K. konishiae

Binomial name
- Kudoa konishiae Sakai, Kato, Sakaguchi, Setsuda & Sato, 2018

Species of myxozoan

Kudoa konishiae is a species of myxozoan in the family Kudoidae. It is a parasite of the Japanese Spanish mackerel.

== Taxonomy and etymology ==
The species was formally described by Haruya Sakai and colleagues in 2018, and they named it after Yoshiko Sugita-Konishi. The type locality is the Sea of Japan.

== Description ==
The plasmodia of this species can be shaped either like a club or a spindle, each containing several myxospores. These myxospores average 7.5 microns long, 9 microns wide and 8.2 microns thick. They have six shell valves and six polar capsules, and are star-shaped when viewed from above. When viewed from the side, they are drawstring-shaped, with the polar capsules on the top half of the myxospore and akin to a teardrop in shape. Compared to other species of its genus with the same number of shell valves and polar capsules, Kudoa konishiae has taller myxospores.

== Ecology ==
The plasmodia of Kudoa konishiae form pseudocysts in the myofiber of the Japanese Spanish mackeral, specifically in the trunk.

== Distribution ==
Kudoa konishiae has been found in mackerels from the Philippine Sea near Kagoshima Prefecture, Japan, the Sea of Japan near Yamaguchi Prefecture, Japan, and in the South China Sea near Zhanjiang City, Guangdong Province, China.
