= L. plantarum =

L. plantarum may refer to:

- Lactobacillus plantarum
- Lactococcus plantarum
