= Kudoa dianae =

Scientific classification
- Kingdom: Animalia
- Phylum: Cnidaria
- Class: Myxosporea
- Order: Multivalvulida
- Family: Kudoidae
- Genus: Kudoa
- Species: K. dianae

Binomial name
- Kudoa dianae Dyková, Fajer Avila & Fiala, 2002

Species of marine parasite

Kudoa dianae is a species of myxosporean parasite that infects bullseye puffers (Sphoeroides annulatus). The parasite primarily infects extramuscular sites in the wall of the esophagus. K. dianae was first described as a novel species in 2002 after analysis of spore morphology and SSU rRNA gene sequence demonstrated that it was distinct from known species of Kudoa.
