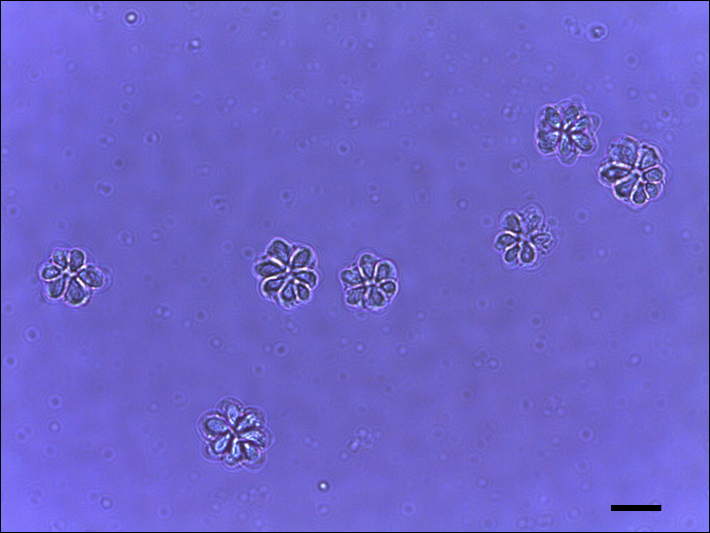
- Kudoa septempunctata - spores

Scientific classification
- Kingdom: Animalia
- Phylum: Cnidaria
- Class: Myxosporea
- Order: Multivalvulida
- Family: Kudoidae; Meglitsch, 1960
- Genus: Kudoa; Meglitsch, 1947

Synonyms
- Hexacapsula Arai & Matsumoto, 1953; Pentacapsula Naidenova & Zaika, 1970; Septemcapsula Hsieh & Chen, 1984

= Kudoa =

Genus of marine parasites

Kudoa is a genus of Myxozoa and the only genus recognized within the monotypic family Kudoidae. There are approximately 100 species of Kudoa all of which parasitize on marine and estuarine fish. Kudoa are most commonly known and studied for the negative effects the genus has on commercial fishing and aquaculture industries.

== Description ==
The genus Kudoa is identified by the possession of four or more shell valves composed of a fragile membrane and arranged in a quadrate or stellate pattern. The maximum number of shell valves in any described Kudoa species is 13. Each of these valves has a polar capsule. The genus Kudoa was originally part of the genus Chloromyxum because of the distribution of their polar capsules, however, it was later determined to be a separate genus. Each Kudoa has two sporoplasm cells, one enclosed by the other. Most Kudoa are histozoic parasites, with a few species being described as coelzoic. Some taxonomists question whether these coelzoic organisms belong to a separate genus. There are approximately 100 described species of Kudoa which can be found in the Atlantic, Pacific, and Indian oceans.

== Species ==
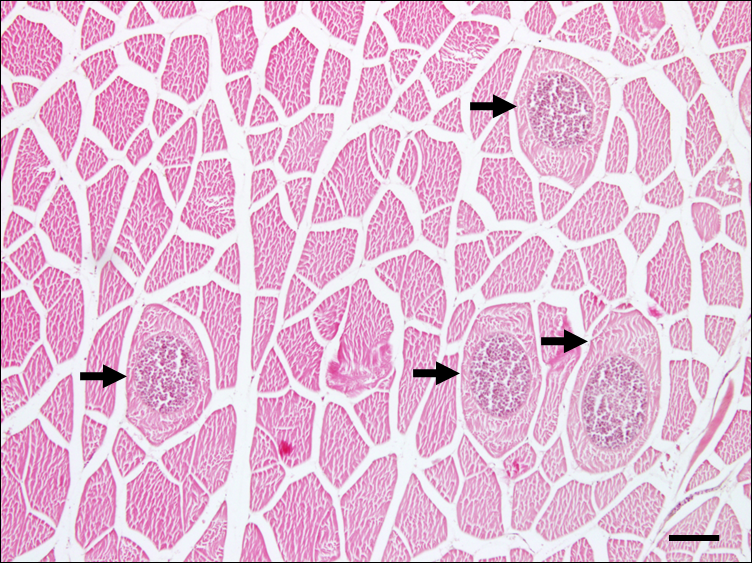
Kudoa septempunctata in olive flounder (Paralichthys olivaceus) muscles.

The following species are recognized in the genus Kudoa:

- Kudoa aburakarei Li, Inoue, Tanaka, Zhang & Sato, 2020
- Kudoa acentrogobia Li, Inoue, Tanaka, Zhang & Sato, 2020
- Kudoa aequidens Casal, Matos, Matos & Azevedo, 2008
- Kudoa ajurutellus Araújo-Neto, Cardim, Da Silva, Hamoy, Matos & Abrunhosa, 2020
- Kudoa akihitoi Kasai, Setsuda & Sato, 2017
- Kudoa alliaria Kovaleva, Shulman & Yakolev, 1979
- Kudoa amamiensis Egusa & Nakajima, 1978
- Kudoa amazonica Velasco, Sindeaux Neto, Videira, de Cássia Silva do Nascimento, Gonçalves & Matos, 2019
- Kudoa anatolica Özer, Okkay, Gürkanlı, Çiftçi & Yurakhno, 2018
- Kudoa azevedoi Mansour, Thabet, Chourabi, Harrath, Gtari, Omar & Hassine, 2013
- Kudoa azoni Aseeva, 2004
- Kudoa barracudai Abdel-Baki, Al-Quraishy, Omar & Mansour, 2016
- Kudoa bengalensis Sarkar & Mazumder, 1983
- Kudoa boopsi Kpatcha, Diebakate, Faye & Toguebaye, 1999
- Kudoa bora Fujita, 1930
- Kudoa borimiri Yurakhno, Slynko, Chinh, Ha & Whipps, 2022
- Kudoa branchiata Joy, 1972
- Kudoa camarguensis Pampoulie, Marques, Crivelli & Boucherau, 1999
- Kudoa carcharhini Gleeson, Bennett & Adlard, 2010
- Kudoa cascasia Sarkar & Chaudry, 1996
- Kudoa caudata Kovaleva & Gaevskaya, 1983
- Kudoa cerebralis Paperna & Zwerner, 1974
- Kudoa chaetodoni Burger, Cribb & Adlard, 2007
- Kudoa cheilodipteri Heiniger, Cribb & Adlard, 2013
- Kudoa chilkaensis Tripathi, 1951
- Kudoa ciliatae Lom, Rohde & Dyková, 1992
- Kudoa clupeidae Hahn, 1917
- Kudoa cookii Heiniger, Cribb & Adlard, 2013
- Kudoa corniculata Li, Inoue, Zhang & Sato, 2022
- Kudoa crenimugilis Abdel-Baki, Abdel-Haleem, Al-Quraishy, Azevedo & Mansour, 2018
- Kudoa cruciformum Matsumoto, 1954
- Kudoa crumena Iversen & van Meter, 1967
- Kudoa cynoglossi Obiekezie & Lick, 1994
- Kudoa dianae Dyková, Fajer & Fiala, 2002
- Kudoa dicentrarchi Sitjà-Bobadilla & Alvarez-Pellitero, 1992
- Kudoa empressmichikoae Kasai, Setsuda & Sato, 2017
- Kudoa encrasicoli Iglesias, Rangel, Fernández-Vázquez, Santos & García-Estévez, 2022
- Kudoa eugerres Casal, Soares, Rocha, Silva, Santos, Nascimento, Oliveira & Azevedo, 2019
- Kudoa fujitai Li, Inoue, Zhang & Sato, 2020
- Kudoa funduli Hahn, 1915
- Kudoa grammatorcyni Adlard, Bryant, Whipps & Kent, 2005
- Kudoa guangdongensis Li, Inoue, Tanaka, Zhang & Sato, 2020
- Kudoa gunterae Burger & Adlard, 2009
- Kudoa haridasae Sarkar & Ghosh, 1991
- Kudoa hemiscylli Gleeson, Bennett & Adlard, 2010
- Kudoa hexapunctata Yokoyama, Suzuki & Shirakashi, 2014
- Kudoa hirsuta Li, Inoue, Zhang & Sato, 2022
- Kudoa histolytica Pérard, 1928
- Kudoa hypoepicardialis Blaylock, Bullard & Whipps, 2004
- Kudoa igami Shirakashi, Yamane, Ishitani, Yanagida & Yokoyama, 2014
- Kudoa igori Yurakhno, Slynko, Chinh, Ha & Whipps, 2022
- Kudoa iidae Li, Inoue, Tanaka, Zhang & Sato, 2020
- Kudoa inornata Dykova, de Buron, Fiala, Roumillat, 2009
- Kudoa insolita Kovaleva, Shulman, & Yakovlev 1979
- Kudoa intestinalis Maeno, Magasawa & Sorimachi, 1993
- Kudoa islandica Kristmundsson & Freeman, 2014
- Kudoa iwatai Egusa & Shiomitsu, 1983
- Kudoa javaensis Yunus, Yustinasari, Natalia, Ghosh, Sakuma, Inoue & Sato, 2021
- Kudoa kabatai Shulman & Kovalijova, 1979
- Kudoa kenti Burger & Adlard, 2009
- Kudoa konishiae Sakai, Kato, Sakaguchi, Setsuda & Sato, 2018
- Kudoa lateolabracis Yokoyama, Whipps, Kent, Mizuno & Kawakami, 2004
- Kudoa leiostomi Dyková, Lom & Overstreet, 1994
- Kudoa lemniscati Miller & Adlard, 2012
- Kudoa leptacanthae Heiniger & Adlard, 2012
- Kudoa lethrini Burger, Cribb & Adlard, 2007
- Kudoa longichorda Inoue, Kasai, Argamjav & Sato, 2022
- Kudoa lunata Lom, Dyková & Lhotákova, 1983
- Kudoa lutjanus Wang, Huang, Tsai, Cheng, Tsai, Chen, Chen, Chiu, Liaw, Chang & Chen, 2005
- Kudoa megacapsula Yokoyama & Itoh, 2005
- Kudoa miniauriculata Whitaker, Kent & Sakanari, 1996
- Kudoa minithyrsites Whipps, Adlard, Bryant, Lester, Findlay & Kent, 2003
- Kudoa mirabilis Naidenova & Gaevskaya, 1991
- Kudoa monodactyli Gunter, Cribb, Whipps & Adlard, 2006
- Kudoa muscularis Cheung, Nigrellu & Ruggieri, 1983
- Kudoa musculoliquefaciens Matsumoto & Arai, 1954
- Kudoa neothunni Arai & Matsumoto, 1953
- Kudoa neurophila Grossel, Dyková, Handlinger & Munday, 2003
- Kudoa niluferi Özer, Okkay, Gürkanlı, Çiftçi & Yurakhno, 2018
- Kudoa nova Naidenova, 1975
- Kudoa obicularis Azevedo, Rocha, Matos, Oliveira, Matos, Al-Quraishy & Casal, 2016
- Kudoa ocellatus Da Silva, Da Silva, Lima, Matos, De Carvalho Sanches, Matos & Hamoy, 2022
- Kudoa ogawai Yokoyama, Yanagida & Shirakashi, 2012
- Kudoa ovivora Swearer & Robertson, 1999
- Kudoa pagrusi Al Quraishy, Koura, Abdel-Baki, Bashtar, El Deed, Al Rasheid & Abdel Ghaffar, 2008
- Kudoa paniformis Kabata & Whitaker, 1981
- Kudoa paralichtys Cho & Kim, 2003
- Kudoa paraquadricornis Burger & Adlard, 2009
- Kudoa parathyrsites Kasai, Li, Mafie & Sato, 2016
- Kudoa parvibulvosa Li, Inoue, Zhang & Sato, 2022
- Kudoa pericardialis Nakajima & Egusa, 1978
- Kudoa permulticapsula Whipps, Adlard, Bryant & Kent, 2003
- Kudoa peruvianus Mateo Salas, 1972
- Kudoa pleurogrammi Kasai, Li, Mafie & Sato, 2016
- Kudoa prunusi Meng, Yokoyama, Shirakashi, Grabner, Ogawa, Ishimaru, Sawada & Murata, 2011
- Kudoa quadratum Thélohan, 1895
- Kudoa quadricornis Whipps, Adlard, Bryant & Kent, 2003
- Kudoa quraishii Mansour, Harrath, Abd-Elkader, Alwasel, Abdel-Baki & Al Omar, 2014
- Kudoa ramsayi Kalavati, Brickle & MacKenzie, 2000
- Kudoa rayformis Shin, Shirakashi, Hamano, Kato, Lasso & Yokoyama, 2016
- Kudoa rosenbuschi Gelormini, 1966
- Kudoa rousseauxii Velasco, Eduard, Neto, Dias, Matos & Gonçalves, 2022
- Kudoa saudiensis Mansour, Harrath, Abdel-Baki, Alwasel, Al-Quraishy & Al Omar, 2015
- Kudoa schulmani Naidenova & Zaika, 1970
- Kudoa sciaenae Teran, Llicán & Lugue, 1990
- Kudoa scomberi Li, Sato, Tanaka, Ohnishi, Kamata & Sugita-Konishi, 2013
- Kudoa scomberomori Adlard, Bryant, Whipps & Kent, 2005
- Kudoa sebastea Aseeva, 2004
- Kudoa septempunctata Matsukane, Sato, Tanaka, Kamata & Sugita-Konishi, 2010
- Kudoa shiomitsui Egusa & Shiomitsu, 1983
- Kudoa shkae Dyková, Lom & Overstreet, 1994
- Kudoa sphyraeni Narasimhamurti & Kalavati, 1979
- Kudoa stellula Yurakhno, 1991
- Kudoa surabayaensis Yunus, Yustinasari, Natalia, Ghosh, Sakuma, Inoue & Sato, 2021
- Kudoa tachysurae Sarkar & Mazumder, 1983
- Kudoa tetraspora Narasimhamurti & Kalavati, 1979
- Kudoa thalassomi Adlard, Bryant, Whipps & Kent, 2005
- Kudoa thunni Matsukane, Sato, Tanaka, Kamata & Sugita-Konishi, 2011
- Kudoa thyrsites Gilchrist, 1924
- Kudoa trachuri Matsukane, Sato, Tanaka, Kamata & Sugita-Konishi, 2011
- Kudoa trifolia Holzer, Blasco-Costa, Sarabeev, Ovcharenko & Balbuena, 2006
- Kudoa unicapsula Yurakhno, Ovcharenko, Holzer, Sarabeev & Balbuena, 2007
- Kudoa viseuensis Monteiro, Da Silva, Hamoy, Sanches & Matos, 2019
- Kudoa whippsi Burger & Adlard, 2009
- Kudoa yasai Cardim, Araújo-Neto, da Silva, Hamoy, Matos & Abrunhosa, 2020
- Kudoa yasunagai Hsieh & Chen, 1984

== Development ==
In Myxozoan development, the Myxosporean life-stage develops inside a fish host, while the Actinosporean life-stage develops in an annelid host. Fully-developed Myxospores are consumed by annelids and reproduce asexually via schzogony in the gut epithelium of worms. Gametes are formed in the gut of the worm and these gametes fuse together to create eight zygotes. The zygotes become spores with three valves, 3 polar capsules, and a sporoplasm that are released in the worm's feces and attach to the surface of a fish host. Once attached to the fish, the gamete injects the sporoplasm cell into the fish. The sporoplast divides forming a fully-developed Myxosporean.

== Diet ==
Kudoa parasitize on marine and estuarine fish. Kudoa typically feed on the skeletal muscle tissue, although some may feed on other parts of the body such as the central nervous system, heart, intestines, ovaries, or gills. Most Kudoa are histozoic parasites, however, a few species are coelozoic. The genus Kudoa attack a wide range of hosts, however, individual species only feed on specific hosts. Kudoa feed via pinocytosis across the host-parasite membrane. One species of Kudoa, K. thyrsites, are distributed worldwide and are believed to have been reported in over 20 different species of fish but it is possible that the species described as K. thyrsites is actually multiple different species.

== Implications for the fishing industry ==
Kudoa are most well known for the economic loss they cause for the commercial fishing and aquaculture industries. When Kudoa attach to hosts, they leave unsightly cysts that lower the price fish can be sold for at market. Kudoa also release proteolytic enzymes that degenerate muscle in fish to aid in their own growth and development, further decreasing the fish's value. Some species in the genus Kudoa with the most notable effects of the commercial fishing and aquaculture industries are: K. musculoliquefaciens in Broadbill Swordfish (Xiphias gladius), K. thyrsites in Atlantic Salmon (Salmo salar), K. clupeidae in Atlantic Herring (Clupea harengus), K. septempunctata in Olive Flounder (Paralichthys olivaceus), K. thunni in Yellowfin Tuna (Thunnus albacares) and K. paniformis in Pacific Hake (Merluccius productus).

Some studies have found evidence to suggest that some species of Kudoa are linked to food-borne illness in humans.
