= Pseudolactococcus laudensis =

Scientific classification
- Domain: Bacteria
- Kingdom: Bacillati
- Phylum: Bacillota
- Class: Bacilli
- Order: Lactobacillales
- Family: Streptococcaceae
- Genus: Lactococcus
- Species: L. laudensis

Binomial name
- Lactococcus laudensis Meucci et al. 2015

Type strain
- DSM 28961, LMG 28353, strain 4195

Species of bacterium

Lactococcus laudensis is a Gram-positive and non-spore-forming bacterium from the genus Lactococcus which has been isolated from raw cow milk from Val Trompia in Italy.
