= Kudoa kenti =

Scientific classification
- Kingdom: Animalia
- Phylum: Cnidaria
- Class: Myxosporea
- Order: Multivalvulida
- Family: Kudoidae
- Genus: Kudoa
- Species: K. kenti

Binomial name
- Kudoa kenti Burger & Adlard, 2009

Species of marine parasite

Kudoa kenti is a myxosporean parasite of marine fishes, first discovered in Australia from 4 pomacentrid species.
