= Lactococcus fujiensis =

Scientific classification
- Domain: Bacteria
- Kingdom: Bacillati
- Phylum: Bacillota
- Class: Bacilli
- Order: Lactobacillales
- Family: Streptococcaceae
- Genus: Lactococcus
- Species: L. fujiensis

Binomial name
- Lactococcus fujiensis Cai et al. 2011

Type strain
- CGMCC 1.10453, DSM 27937, JCM 16395, YC-2009, NJ 317

Species of bacterium

Lactococcus fujiensis is a gram-positive and facultatively anaerobic bacterium from the genus Lactococcus which has been isolated from the leaves of Chinese cabbage from Fujinomiya in Japan.
