= Lactococcus hircilactis =

Scientific classification
- Domain: Bacteria
- Kingdom: Bacillati
- Phylum: Bacillota
- Class: Bacilli
- Order: Lactobacillales
- Family: Streptococcaceae
- Genus: Lactococcus
- Species: L. hircilactis

Binomial name
- Lactococcus hircilactis Meucci et al. 2015

Type strain
- DSM 28960, LMG 28352, strain 117

Species of bacterium

Lactococcus hircilactis is a Gram-positive and non-spore-forming bacterium from the genus Lactococcus which has been isolated from raw goat milk in Valtellina in Italy.
