= Lactococcus nasutitermitis =

Scientific classification
- Domain: Bacteria
- Kingdom: Bacillati
- Phylum: Bacillota
- Class: Bacilli
- Order: Lactobacillales
- Family: Streptococcaceae
- Genus: Lactococcus
- Species: L. nasutitermitis

Binomial name
- Lactococcus nasutitermitis Yan et al. 2016

Type strain
- CGMCC 1.15204, M19, NBRC 111537

Species of bacterium

Lactococcus nasutitermitis is a bacterium from the genus Lactococcus which has been isolated from the gut of the termite Nasutitermes hainanensis.
