= Lactococcus piscium =

Scientific classification
- Domain: Bacteria
- Kingdom: Bacillati
- Phylum: Bacillota
- Class: Bacilli
- Order: Lactobacillales
- Family: Streptococcaceae
- Genus: Lactococcus
- Species: L. piscium

Binomial name
- Lactococcus piscium Williams, Frye & Collins, 1990

Species of bacterium

Lactococcus piscium is a known fish pathogen affecting salmonid fish, which has nevertheless been found in other sources, such as packaged beef. Its type strain is NCFB 2778. L. piscium has shown promise as a bioprotective culture in the preservation of seafood. The bacterium has exhibited the ability to prevent sensory deterioration of food and inhibit the growth of other psychrophilic bacteria that may produce spoilage.
