= Trilosporidae =

Scientific classification
- Kingdom: Animalia
- Phylum: Cnidaria
- Class: Myxozoa
- Order: Multivalvulida
- Family: Trilosporidae

Family of cnidarians

Trilosporidae is a family of cnidarians belonging to the order Multivalvulida.

Genera:

- Trilospora Noble, 1939
- Unicapsula Davis, 1924
