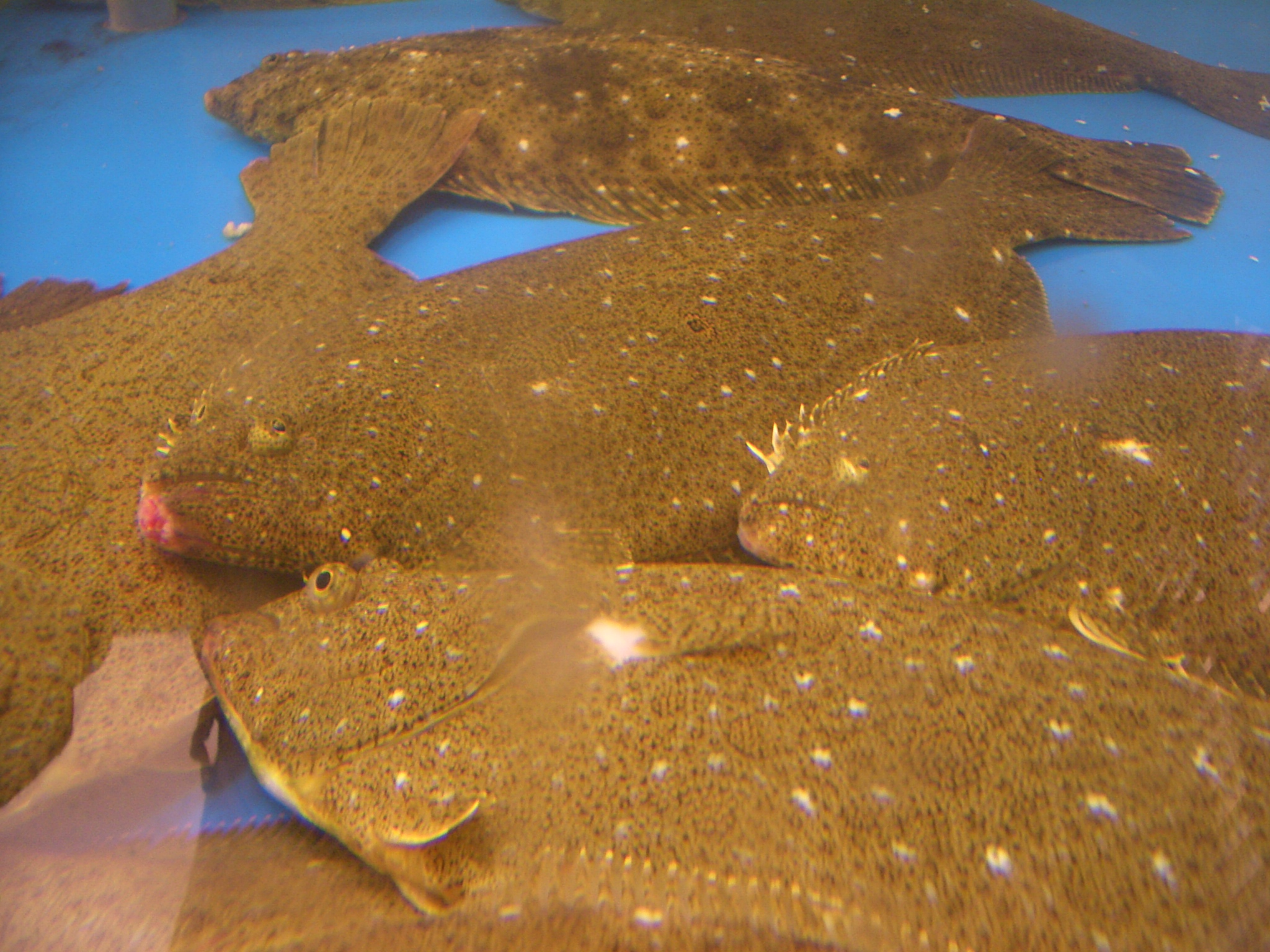
- In a supermarket display tank
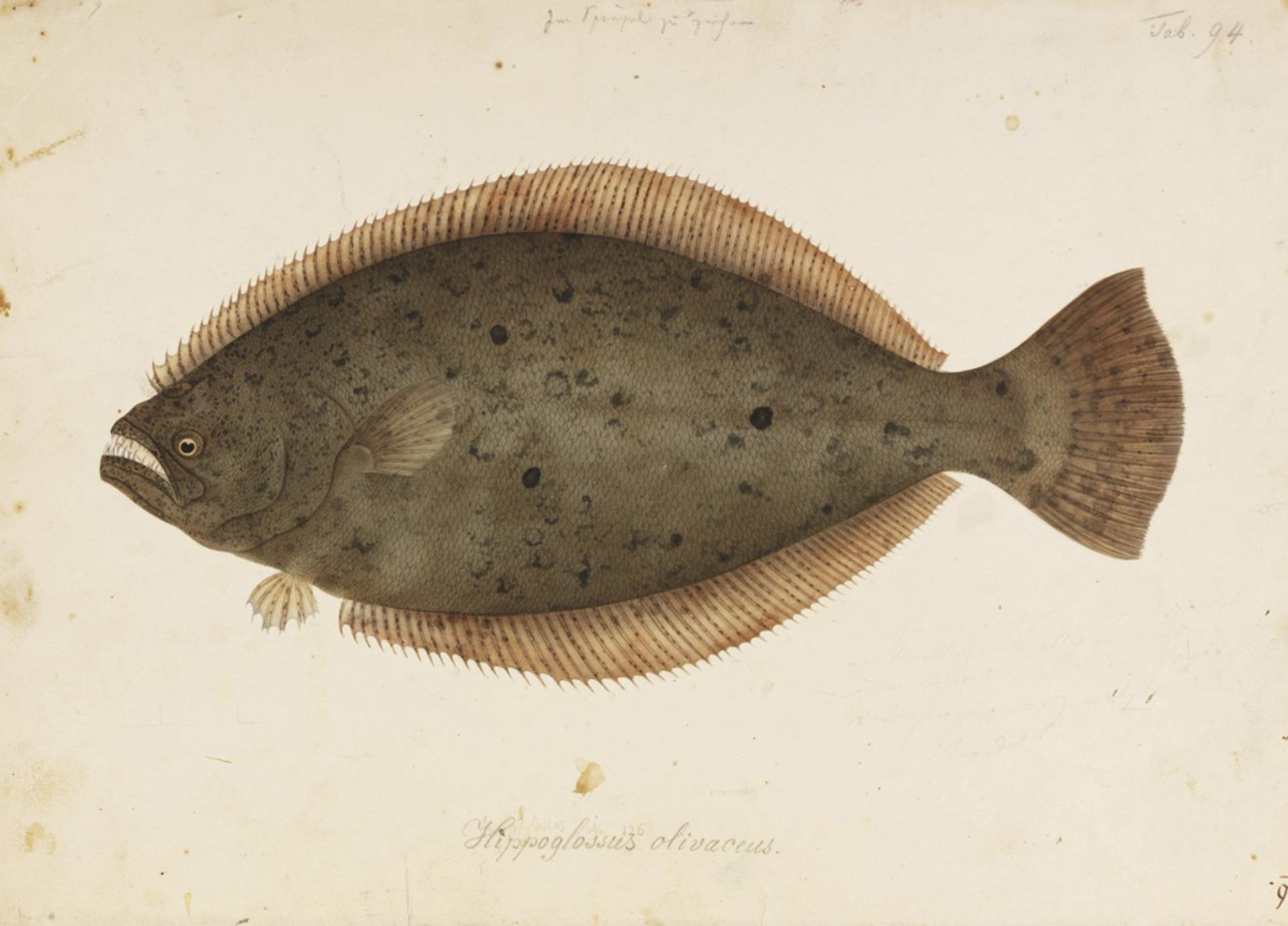
- Drawing by Kawahara Keiga

Scientific classification
- Kingdom: Animalia
- Phylum: Chordata
- Class: Actinopterygii
- Division: Teleostei
- Order: Carangiformes
- Suborder: Pleuronectoidei
- Family: Paralichthyidae
- Genus: Paralichthys
- Species: P. olivaceus

Binomial name
- Paralichthys olivaceus (Temminck & Schlegel, 1846)

Synonyms
- Hippoglossus olivaceus Temminck & Schlegel, 1846

= Olive flounder =

Species of fish

The olive flounder (Paralichthys olivaceus), bastard halibut, Japanese flounder or Korean halibut is a temperate marine species of large-tooth flounder native to the North-western Pacific Ocean. It is a high valued fin-fish, known to be excellent for aquaculture due to a rapid growth rate and popularity in Japan and Korea.

== Names ==
In Japanese, olive flounder is called hirame (ヒラメ). In Korean, it is called gwangeo (광어; 廣魚; lit. 'flatfish'). In Chinese, it is called yaping (牙鮃) or biankouyu (扁口魚).

In English, in addition to "olive flounder", it is also known as "bastard flounder", "Japanese flounder", or "Korean flatfish".

== Description ==
It reaches a length of 103 cm (41 in) and a weight of 9.1 kg (20 lb). In 2017 its genome and transcriptome was sequenced as a model to study flatfish asymmetry.

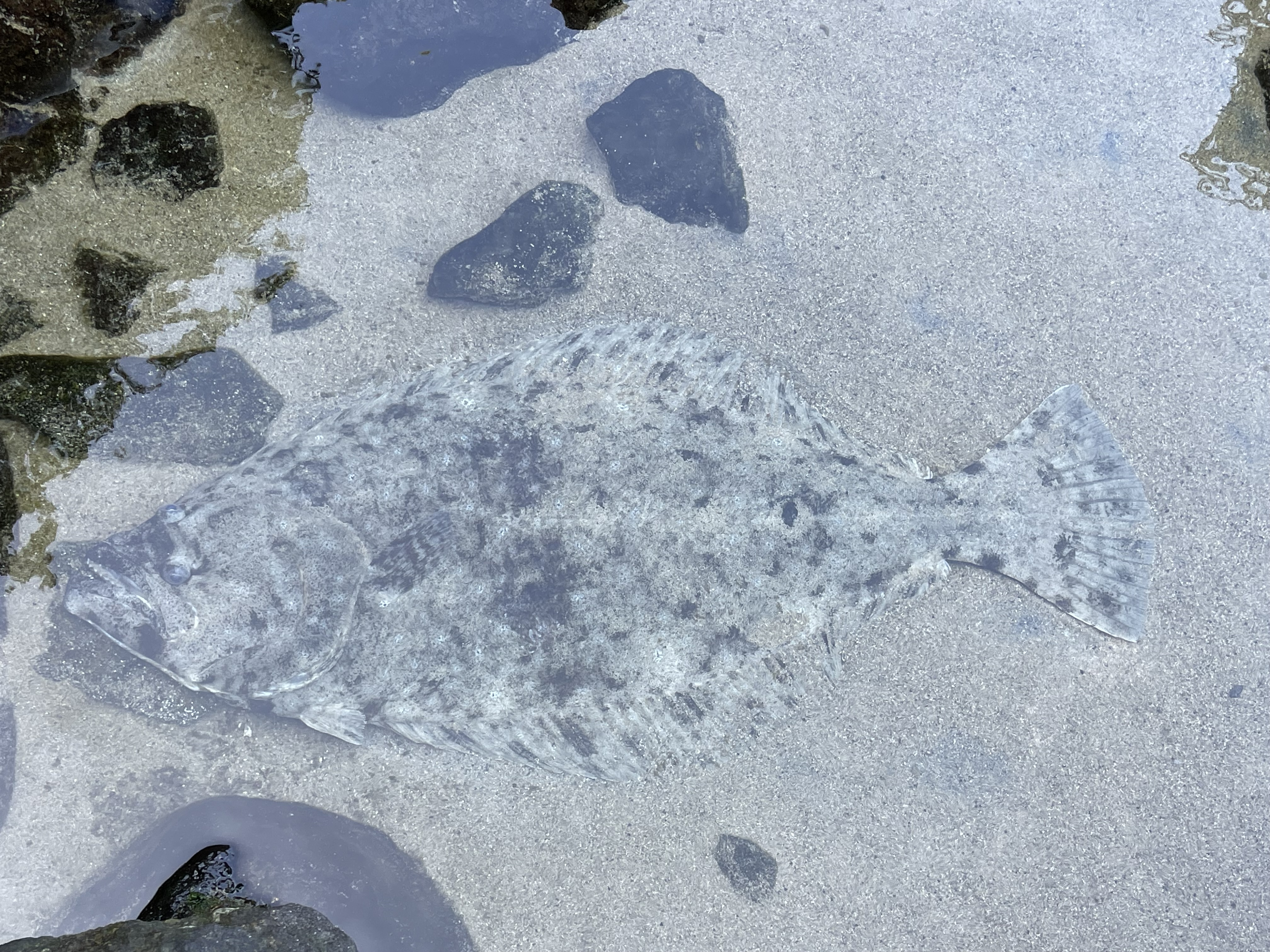
Specimen at Joetsu Aquarium

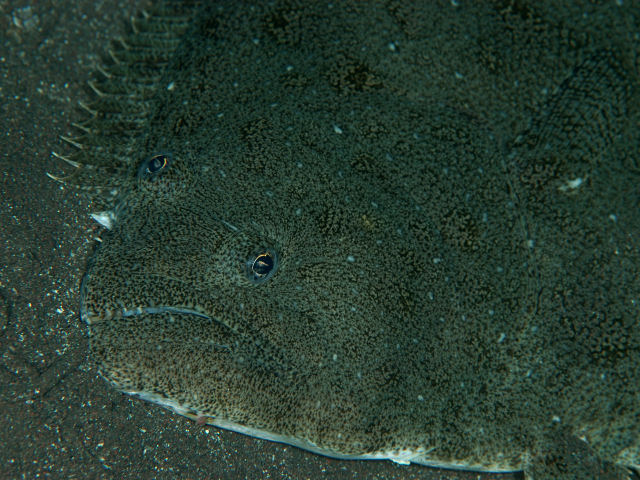
Closeup of eyes

== Biology ==
=== Habitat and diet ===
The olive flounder is often found in soft and muddy offshore, coastal areas where the water level goes down to 100 m in depth. The temperature of water in these areas range from 21–24 °C or 69–75 °F.

Olive flounder typically eat fish spawn, crustaceans, polychaetes, and small fish.

=== Life cycle ===
Olive flounder spawn anytime from January through August in shallow water, roughly about 70 cm in depth. The egg and larvae remain that way for about 24–50 days after hatching. Once they begin their metamorphosis process, they move towards more sandy areas and feed on shrimp. After achieving metamorphosis, the flounder move offshore and begin feeding on bigger fish in order to grow to their adult size.

Young olive flounder hatch with a bilaterally symmetrical body plan typical of most fish. Over 24 to 50 days, they undergo metamorphosis: the body flattens, one eye migrates to the opposite side of the head, and the fish settles onto its side, living with both eyes facing upward.

=== Parasites ===
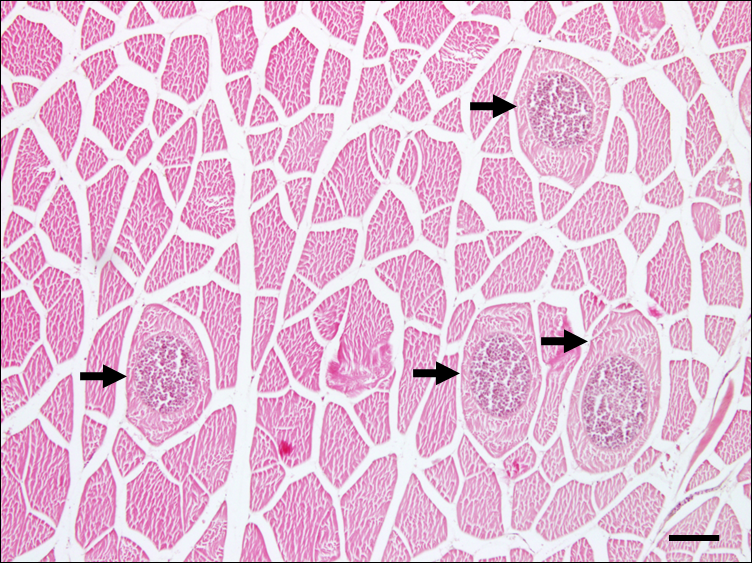
Kudoa septempunctata in olive flounder muscles

The myxozoan Kudoa septempunctata has been described in 2010 from olive flounder from Korea. This microscopic parasite infects the trunk muscles of the olive flounder where it causes myoliquefaction. Ingestion of raw fish containing K. septempunctata spores has been reported as a cause of food poisoning (gastroenteritis) in Japan since 2003.

Non-human laboratory studies performed in 2015 and 2016 on adult and suckling mice showed that K. septempunctata spores were excreted in faeces and did not affect the gastrointestinal tract. However, a 2023 study using improved animal models (suckling mice maintained at 31–35°C and house musk shrews) demonstrated that K. septempunctata spores do cause diarrhea and emesis by disrupting intestinal tight junctions and inducing serotonin secretion, reconciling the earlier discrepancies.

=== Bacteria ===
Olive flounder are susceptible to bacterial infections. Notable bacterial pathogens include Streptococcus parauberis and Vibrio ichthyoenteri.

== Relation to humans ==
=== Aquaculture ===
Capture (blue) and aquaculture (green) production of Bastard halibut (Paralichthys olivaceus) in thousand tonnes from 1950 to 2022, as reported by the FAO

The olive flounder is the most common flatfish species raised in aquaculture in Korea. In 2022, 46,000 tons of olive flounder was produced in South Korea, representing 50.5% of the total aquaculture production within the country. Although the aquaculture for the olive flounder started from the late 1980s, its commercial production didn't begin on a major scale until the 1990s in Korea.

Olive flounder are also farmed in Japan and China as well.

=== As food ===
Olive flounder is widely eaten as food in East Asia, often raw. Hoe (횟감) is the Korean preparation of raw olive flounder (광어), typically sliced thinly and served with gochujang (red chili paste), sesame oil, and vinegar-based sauces. In Japan, raw olive flounder (ヒラメ, hirame) is served as sushi or sashimi, often with ponzu (citrus-soy sauce) and considered a prized white fish for its firm, clean texture. In China, the olive flounder is a popular culinary fish, commonly prepared steamed with ginger and scallions, braised with soybean paste, or cooked as a collagen-rich fish head soup.

Raw consumption of olive flounder carries a risk of Kudoa septempunctata poisoning, causing acute vomiting and diarrhea within hours.

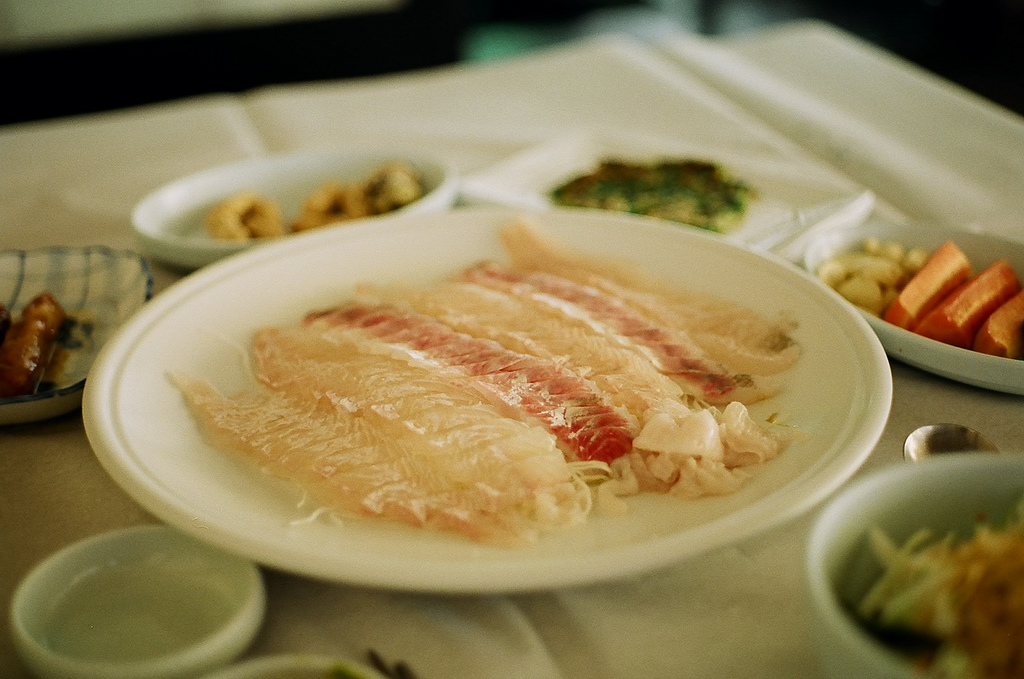
Korean hoe

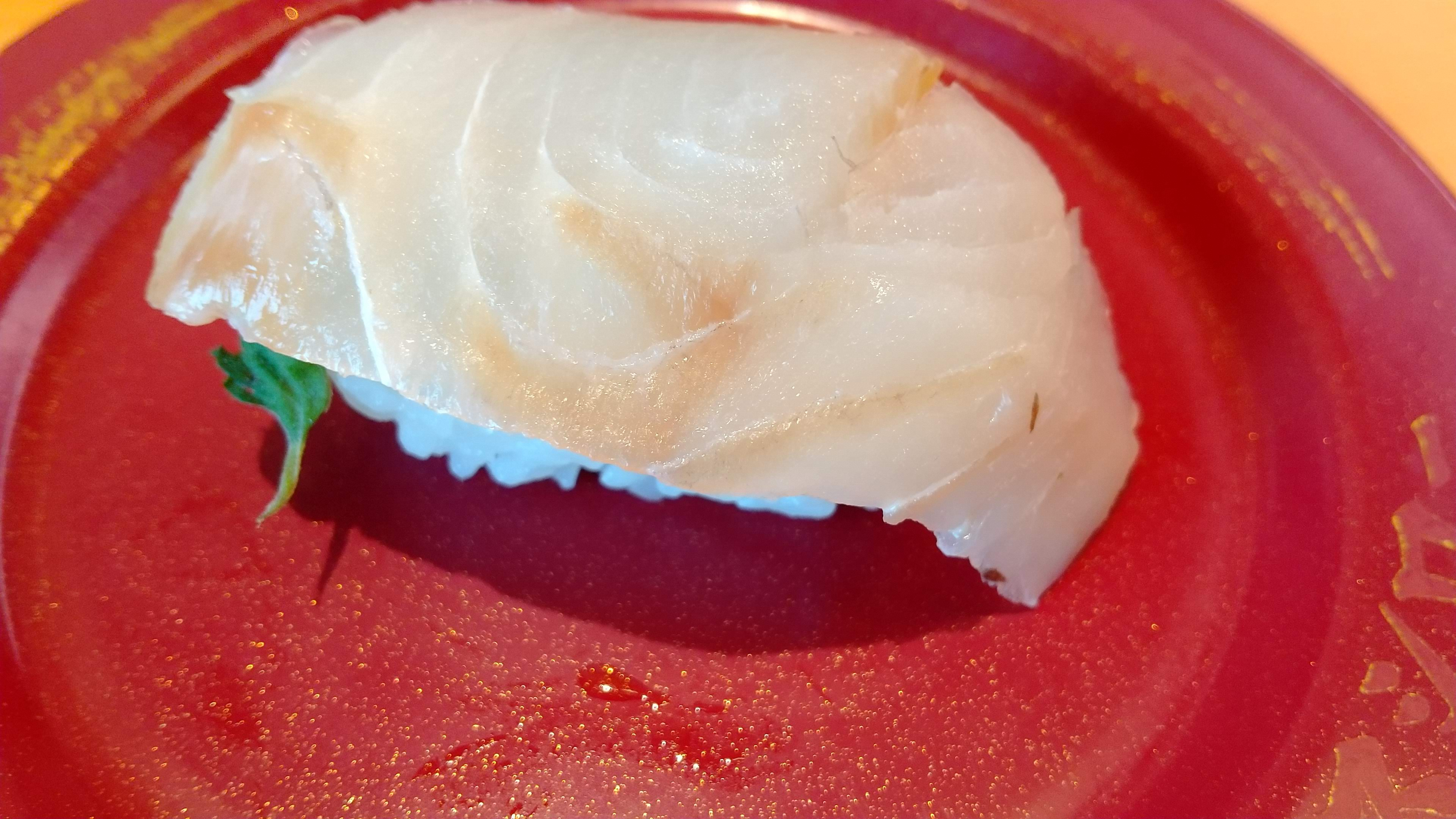
Japanese sushi

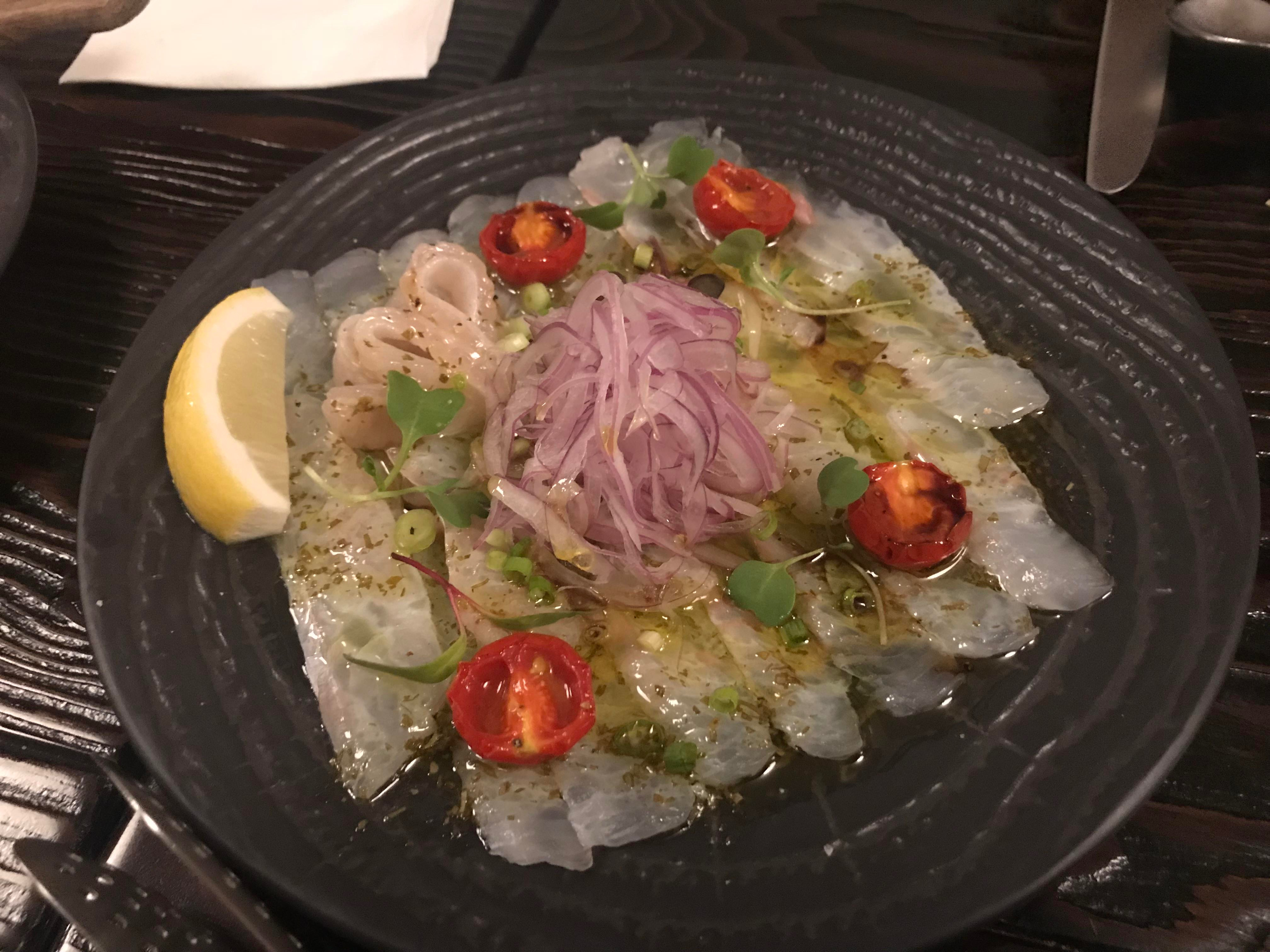
Italian carpaccio

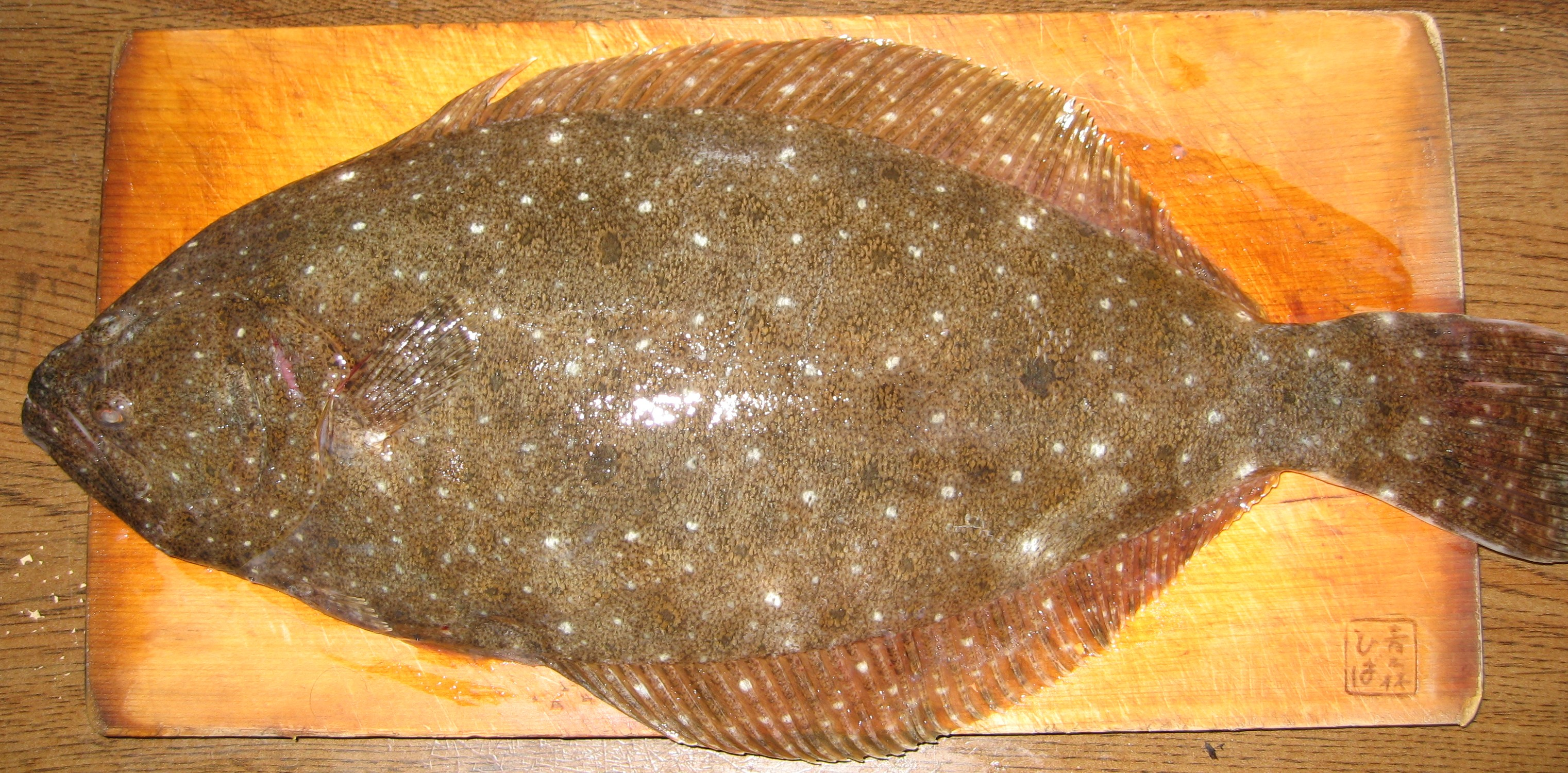

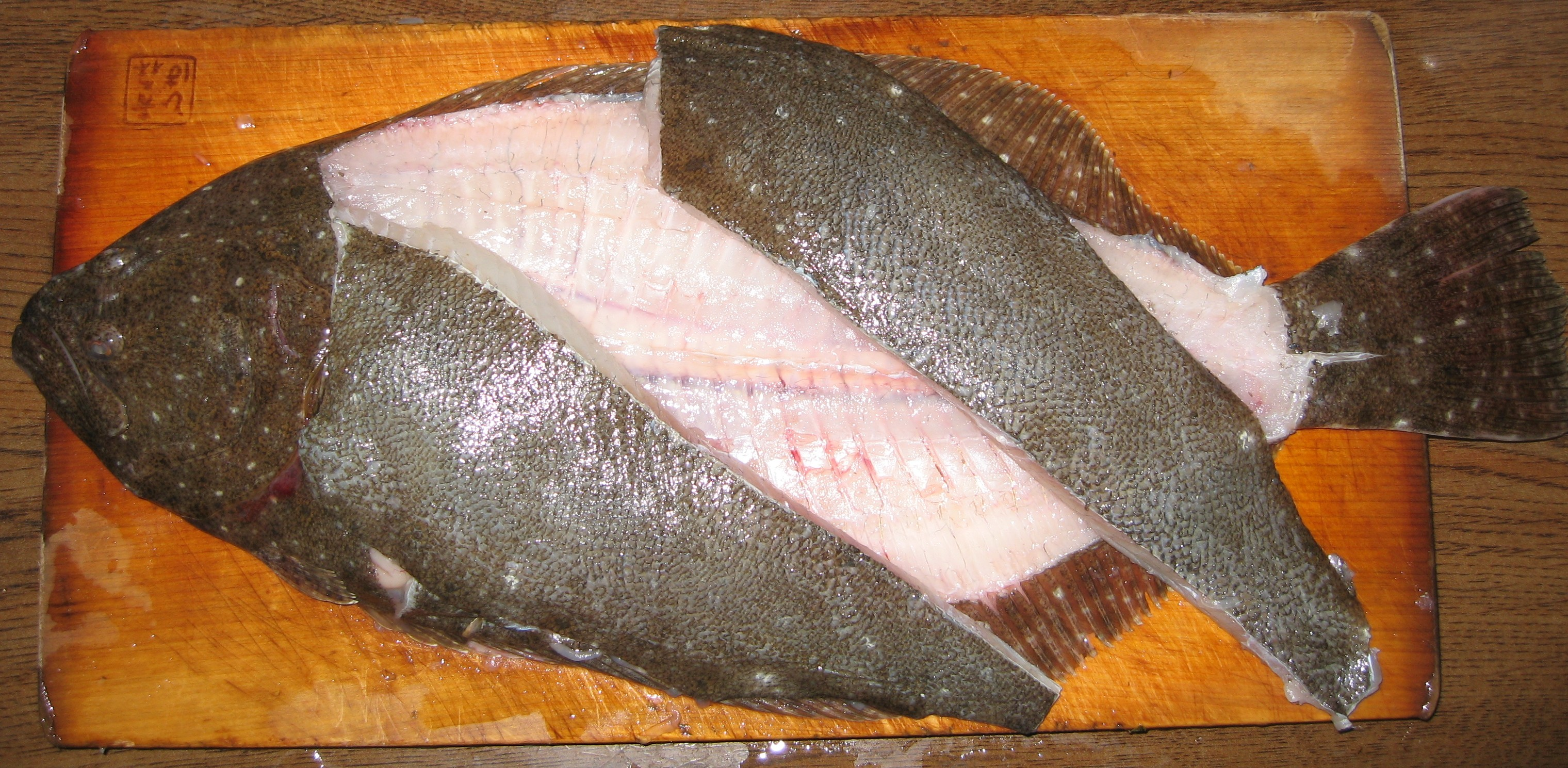

=== Japan–Korea trade and food safety dispute ===
A 2019 analysis in the Journal of Korea Trade suggested that Japan's enhanced inspections of farmed Korean flounder for K. septempunctata were motivated by retaliation in a separate WTO dispute over radionuclides rather than solely by food safety concerns. However, although scientific evidence has indicated the pathogenicity of the parasite and control measures like PCR testing have reduced cases, infections persist and clinicians should suspect Kudoa in raw-fish-related food poisoning. As of 2025, Korea continues to export olive flounder to Japan under enhanced inspection protocols, while domestic consumption in Korea (as hoe) remains high despite ongoing food safety awareness campaigns.

=== Appearances in media ===
The olive flounder appears in Animal Crossing: New Horizons, along with other games in the series, as one of the various fish the player is able to catch using a fishing rod.
