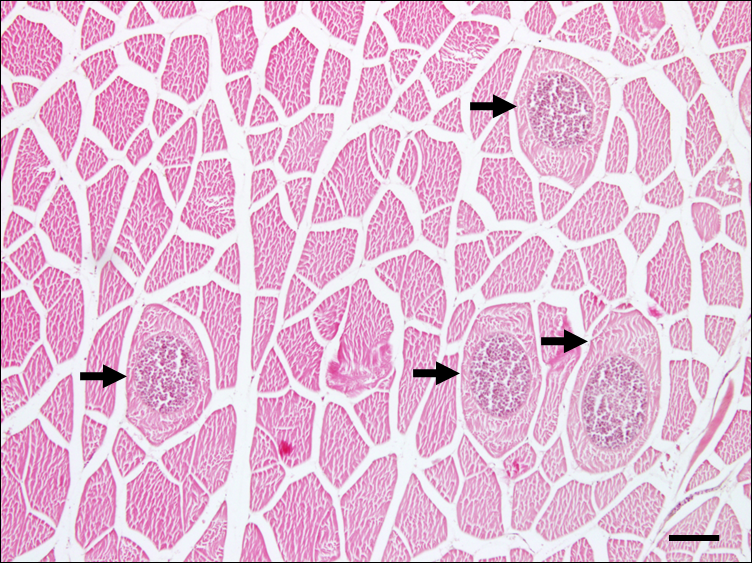

Scientific classification
- Kingdom: Animalia
- Phylum: Cnidaria
- Class: Myxosporea
- Order: Multivalvulida
- Family: Kudoidae
- Genus: Kudoa
- Species: K. septempunctata

Binomial name
- Kudoa septempunctata Matsukane, Sato, Tanaka, Kamata, & Sugita-Konishi, 2010

= Kudoa septempunctata =

Myxosporean parasite

Kudoa septempunctata is a myxosporean parasite commonly found in the muscle tissue of olive flounders. The parasite is associated with food poisoning. Cases typically involve consumption of raw or undercooked infected flounder, particularly as sashimi or sushi.

== Description ==
The species was first described in 2010 from olive flounder imported from Korea to Japan. The name septempunctata refers to the seven (Latin: septem) polar capsules found in each spore, though spores may contain six or seven capsules. K. septempunctata has also been found in the muscle tissue of the grey-spotted puffer (Takifugu alboplumbeus) and Japanese whiting (Sillago japonica). However, spore density was significantly lower than that often found in olive flounders and lower than concentrations that often pose a risk to humans. It is possible that the parasite has more hosts that are yet to be discovered.

== Food poisoning ==
Since 2003, outbreaks of acute gastroenteritis linked to raw olive flounder consumption have been reported in Japan. Symptoms include vomiting and diarrhea that typically begin within 12 hours of ingestion and resolve within a few days. From 2013 to 2023, Japan reported 2,009 cases, with a peak of 429 cases in 2014. Most cases occur in older adults, with those aged 60 and older accounting for nearly half of all cases. October is the peak month for reported illnesses.

Food poisoning caused by K. septempunctata shares clinical and epidemiological similarities with Staphylococcus aureus and Bacillus cereus intoxication, including short incubation periods and symptoms lasting less than 24 hours. A 2017 analysis noted that 45% of food poisoning outbreaks in South Korea were classified as having an unknown cause, raising the possibility of misdiagnosis between these conditions.

Studies simulating human intestinal conditions have shown that K. septempunctata sporoplasms cannot survive for extended periods, with viability dropping to 8.4% after 48 hours at 37°C (human body temperature) and showing strong susceptibility to bile.

A 2026 prospective cohort study from South Korea found that consumers exposed to K. septempunctata-infected olive flounder had a relative risk of gastrointestinal symptoms ranging from 71.2 to 124.5 compared to unexposed individuals, providing strong evidence of a causal relationship.

Non-human laboratory studies performed in 2015 and 2016 on adult and suckling mice showed that K. septempunctata spores were excreted in faeces and did not affect the gastrointestinal tract.

== Geographic distribution ==
Cases are most common in western Japan and along the Sea of Japan coast. The highest incidence rates occur in Tottori, Shimane, Yamaguchi, and Oita prefectures. The parasite has also been detected in olive flounder farmed in South Korea, particularly on Jeju Island.

== Control measures ==
Following the identification of K. septempunctata as a foodborne pathogen, Japanese authorities implemented control measures including ultraviolet treatment of rearing water during seed production, PCR testing of farmed flounder, and quantitative PCR testing of imported flounder at customs checkpoints.
