= Spinavaculidae =

Scientific classification
- Kingdom: Animalia
- Phylum: Cnidaria
- Class: Myxozoa
- Order: Multivalvulida
- Family: Spinavaculidae

Family of cnidarians

Spinavaculidae is a family of cnidarians belonging to the order Multivalvulida.

Genera:

- Octospina Hsieh & Xiao, 1993
