= Joetsu Aquarium =

Joetsu Aquarium Umigatari
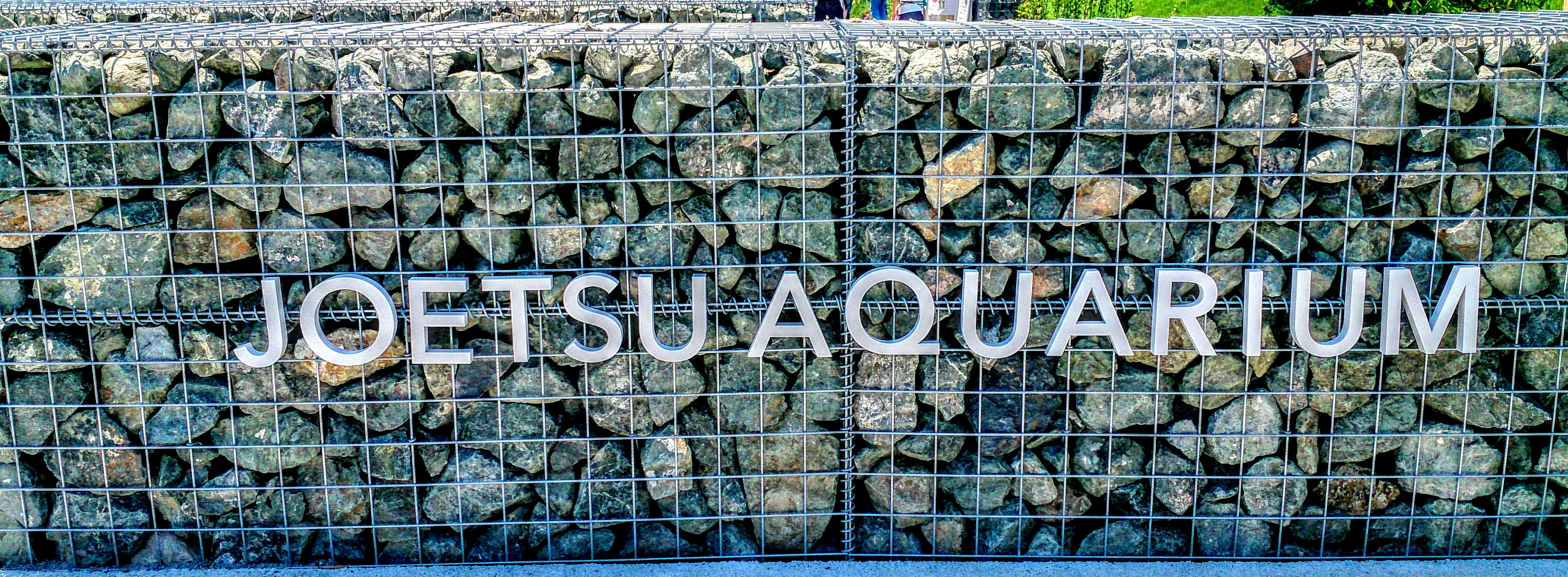

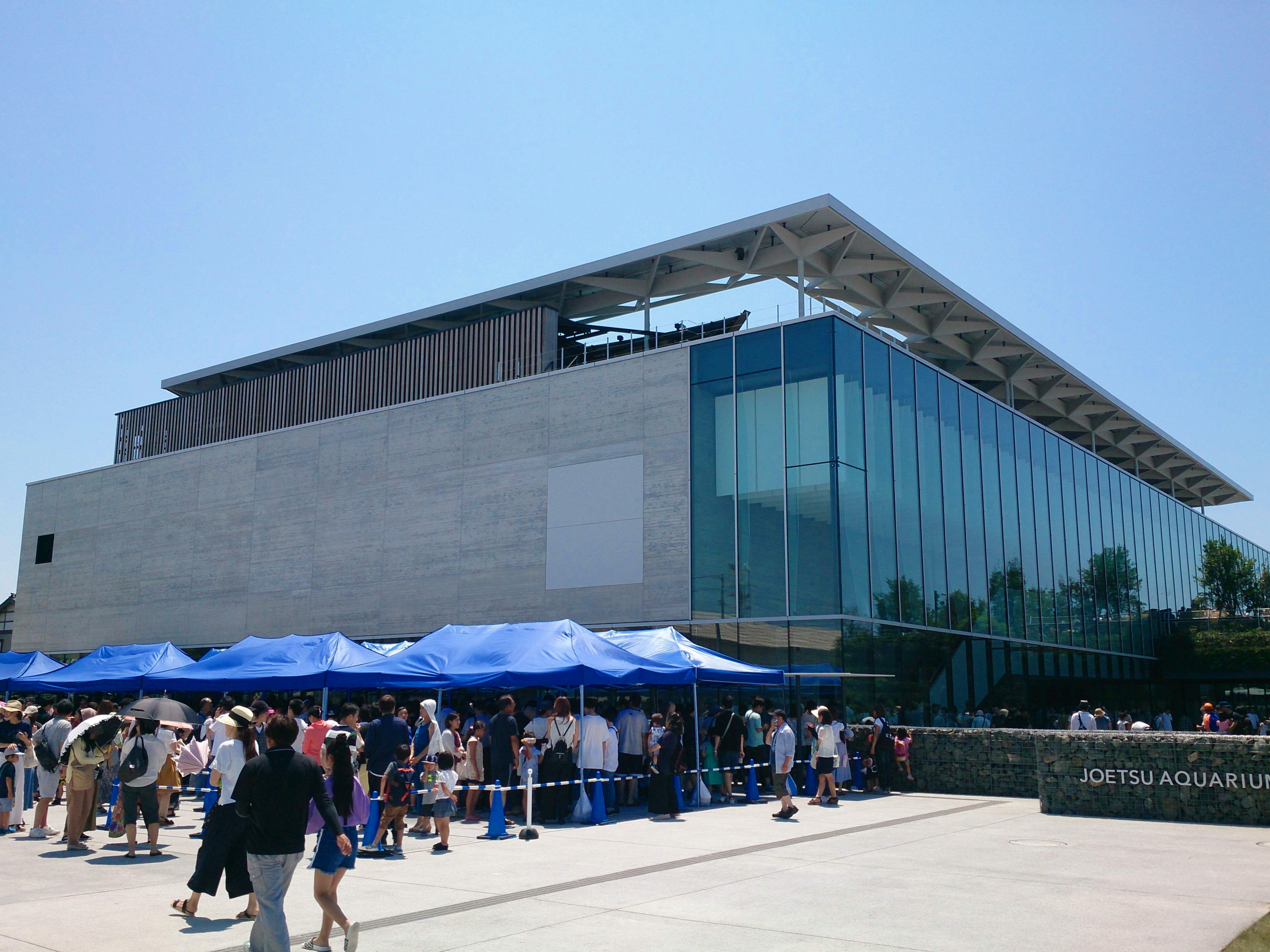
- Exterior
- Interactive map of Joetsu Aquarium Umigatari
- 37.10246°N 138.13587°E
- Date opened: June 2018
- Location: Joetsu, Niigata, Japan
- Land area: 8,439 m^{2} (90,840 sq ft)
- No. of animals: 45,000
- No. of species: 300
- Volume of largest tank: 1,100,000 litres (291,000 US gal)
- Total volume of tanks: 3,117,000 litres (823,000 US gal)
- Memberships: JAZA
- Management: Yokohama Hakkeijima
- Website: www.umigatari.jp/joetsu/

Joetsu Aquarium (上越市立水族博物館) is a Japanese public aquarium owned by Joetsu City, and located in Niigata Prefecture. Its origins date back to 1934, but it reopened in June 2018 under the nickname "Umigatari" (うみがたり). The aquarium is dedicated to the Sea of Japan, with the concept of discussing the sea.

It is a member of the Japanese Association of Zoos and Aquariums (JAZA), and the aquarium is accredited as a Registered Museum by the Museum Act from Ministry of Education, Culture, Sports, Science and Technology.

== History ==
It is located on the coast of the Sea of Japan, near the center of the Naoetsu district of Joetsu City. The museum's origins date back to the opening of a private aquarium in 1934, which became a museum in 1953, and was transferred to the municipal government in 1954.

=== First generation ===
On July 23, 1933, the Nose Aquarium, the first aquarium in the Joetsu region, was opened by Eirokuro Taki, who ran an inn in Nose Town (present-day Itoigawa), Niigata Prefecture.

The facility was designed by Hirata Baozei, who was involved in the Yokohama Aquarium, which opened in 1928, and exhibited about 40 species of freshwater and saltwater fish and crustaceans in 14 aquariums. However, this facility was destroyed by waves in 1934, while the aquarium was closed for the winter.

On July 21 of the same year, Taki opened the Naoetsu Aquarium in the precincts of Yasaka Shrine in the town of Naoetsu, with a 1-inch (2.54 cm) thick glass aquarium equipped with a circulating filtration system to display local fish species, and a large tank in which giant sea bream and trout were released.

The museum also received a donation of green turtles captured from a fisheries school. In its second year of operation, the tank was expanded, but Taki decided to close the museum, due to lack of cooperation from the town of Naoetsu, and as a result of the survival movement and the attractions in the surrounding community, it was decided to build a new building and move to the area near Gochi Kokubunji in Kasuga Village (later incorporated into Takada City, now Joetsu City) The decision was made.

=== Second generation ===
On May 6, 1936, the aquarium moved to Kasuga Village and opened as Gochi Aquarium. The building was done in the style of a small light blue movie theater, and although it was often very crowded with students on school trips and groups of tourists, it was closed in 1943 due to the Pacific War.

=== Third generation ===
In March 1949, Shozo Nakata opened the Naoetsu Aquarium (second generation) on the sandy beach of Motosunayama, Naoetsu Town, a one-story wooden structure of 86 tsubo (860 m2) with twelve tanks and two reservoirs, with the policy of introducing many fish species and using them as educational resources.

However, in October 1950, Nakata proposed to the town of Naoetsu that the aquarium be sold, and although the transfer to the town did not materialise in the end, it was acquired by volunteers, and on March 1, 1951, the Naoetsu Aquarium Foundation was established with approval from the prefecture.

The museum then applied for registration as a museum due to the fact that two-thirds of its visitors were students on school and pre-school trips, and on June 10, 1953, it was approved and the Naoetsu Aquarium Foundation was inaugurated.

On December 8, 1953, the board of directors decided to donate the Aquatic Museum to Naoetsu Town, and the museum was transferred to Naoetsu Town on April 1, 1954. The inauguration of the museum as a public institution took place on June 10, nine days after the inauguration of Naoetsu City, and the Naoetsu Municipal Aquatic Museum was inaugurated.

=== Fourth generation ===
Due to its aging facilities and the problem of wave erosion on the coast, the Aquatic Museum was newly built and relocated to the Seaside Park in 1957.

The museum was equipped with 13 tanks, a fish release tank, and a large flat tank in the middle of the exhibition room (a flat tank that visitors could look into from above), and exhibited more than 60 species of marine life, including fur seals.

There was also an outdoor breeding shed where Japanese macaques, bears, ducks, Indian peafowl, and other animals were kept. Until this time, the Aquarium was not equipped for wintering, and when winter approached, the fish and other animals kept there were released into the wild and the museum was closed until spring.

With the establishment of Joetsu City on April 29, 1971, the Aquatic Museum became the Joetsu City Aquatic Museum.

=== Fifth generation ===
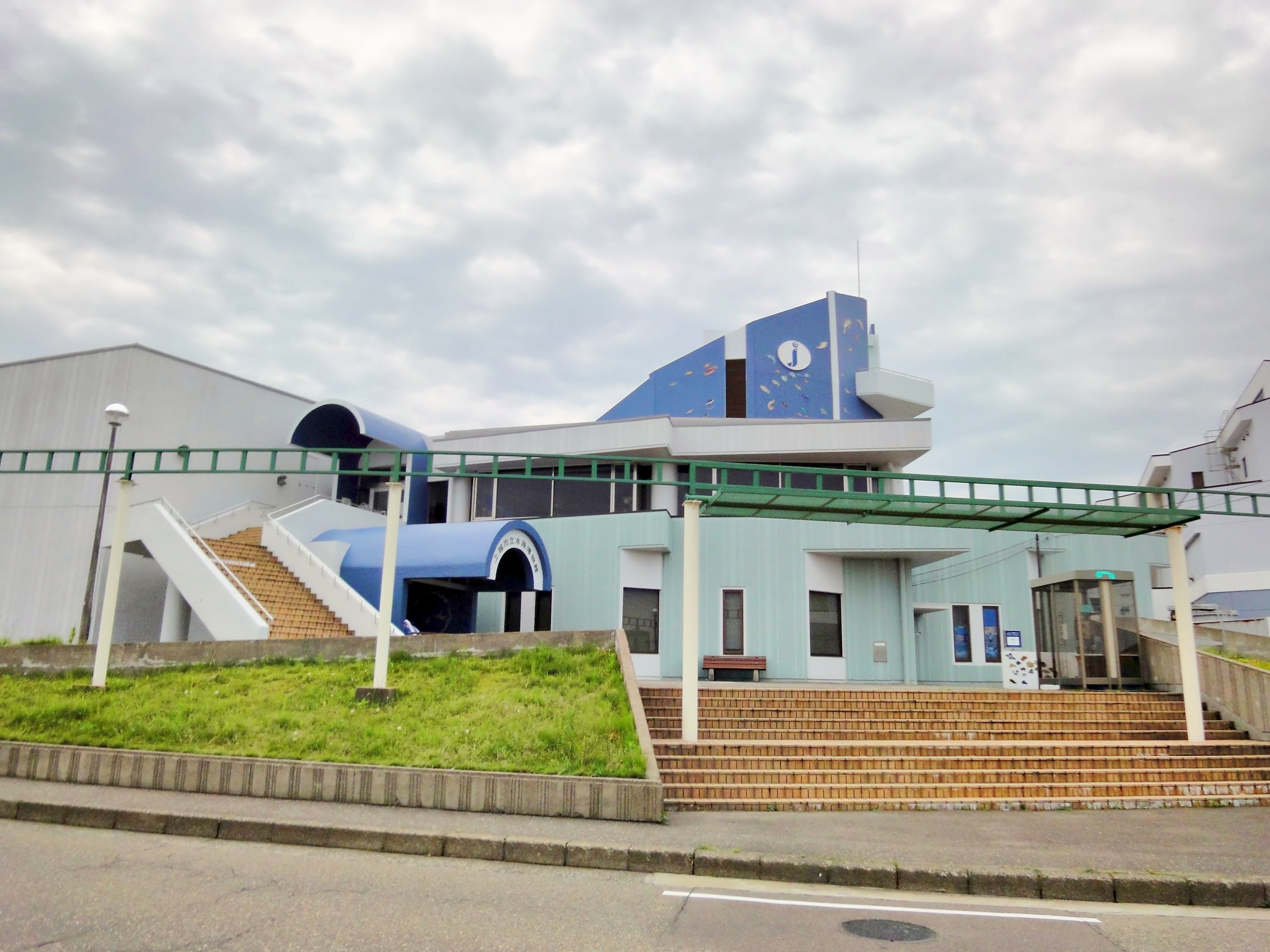
Exterior of fifth generation Joetsu Aquarium

In 1980, the aquarium opened to compete with Oga Aquarium, the largest aquarium on the coast of the Sea of Japan at the time, due to its aging facilities and inferiority to other aquariums.

The design of the building's exterior was based on the motif of dugout boats and shells, which are designated as Important Tangible Folk Cultural Properties of Japan, and the building was constructed of reinforced concrete with 56 tanks on two floors above ground and one below. The facility was repeatedly expanded and renovated, including the installation of Marine Jumbo, Penguin Land, and Marine Stadium in 1993, and at the time of its closing in 2017, approximately 400 species and 10,000 exhibits were on display in 74 tanks. The number of species kept at the museum during its opening period amounted to 1,412.

When the aquarium opened, an elevated cycle monorail was installed around its perimeter. The monorail was used by about 28,000 visitors per year, but towards the end of its lifespan, maintenance costs were equal to the revenue. The building was subsequently demolished.

In 2006, Joetsu City established the "New Aquarium Development Study Committee" to consider reconstruction, but plans were temporarily suspended in 2007, due to financial problems at the time. Furthermore, the Marine Jumbo, a large water tank, was damaged by the 2004 Chūetsu earthquake, and repair work was carried out.

However, the tank did not meet earthquake resistance standards, and no major renovations were carried out. With the Hokuriku Shinkansen bullet train scheduled to open in the spring of 2015, it was necessary to consider the effect on attracting visitors, and in November 2011, work began again on the plan.

=== Sixth generation (present) ===
Yokohama Hakkeijima Sea Paradise, which operates the Yokohama Hakkeijima Sea Paradise amusement park, became the designated manager on April 1, 2015, and the new facility opened on June 26, 2018, after the transition to a system run by the company.

The Sixth Joetsu Aquarium building received the BCS Award from the Japan Federation of Construction Contractors for its design of the Umigatari tank was evaluated.

== Exhibits ==
=== Magellanic Penguin Museum ===
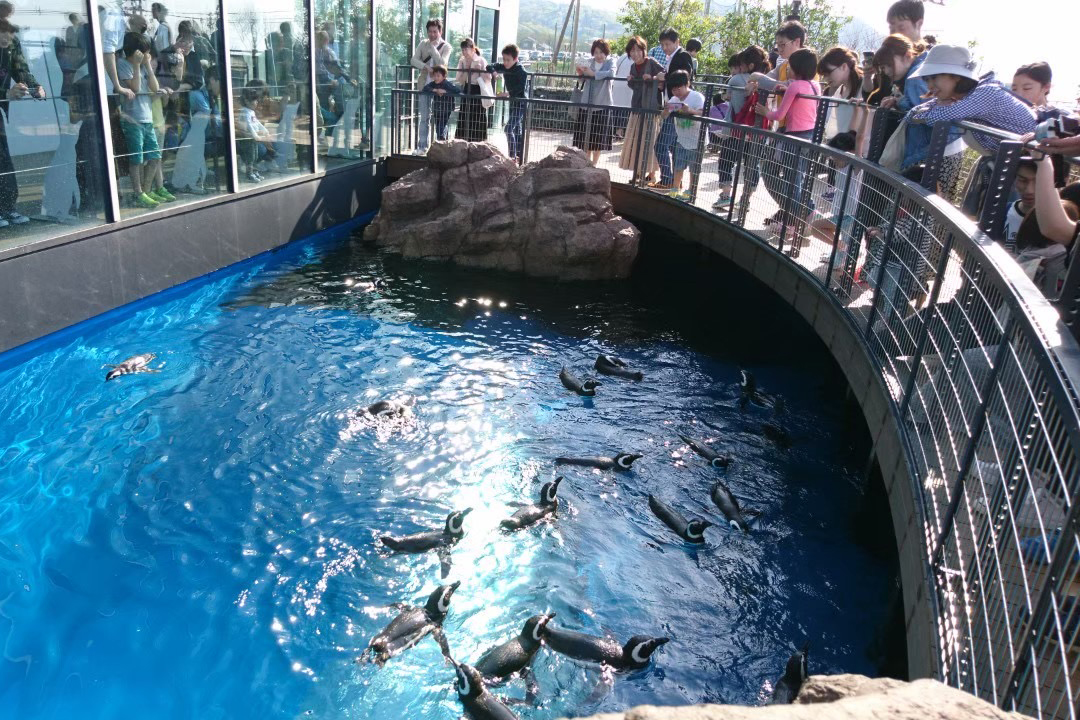
Magellanic penguin museum pool

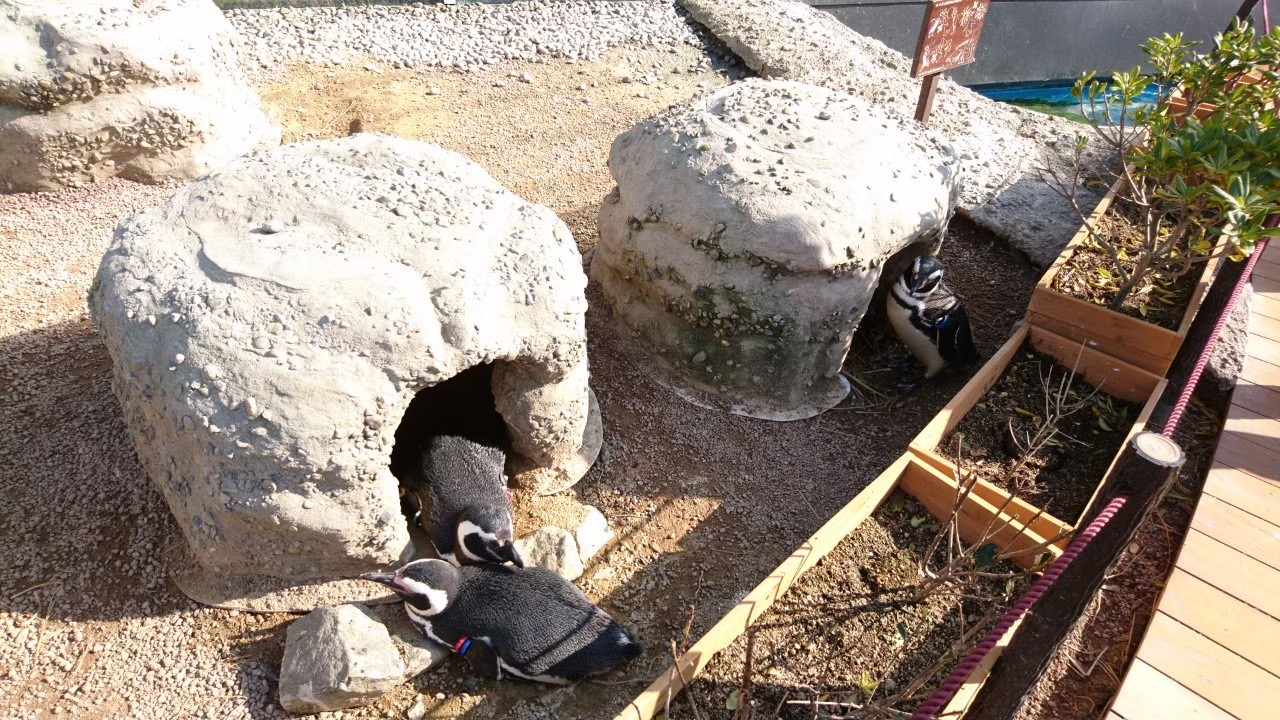
Many of the burrows in the breeding area were built to resemble the penguins' environment in Argentina.

The museum's Magellanic Penguin Museum keeps the largest number of Magellanic penguins in the world, with 118 as of June 28, 2018 and 124 as of October 2019.

Breeding activity is very active, with an average of seven new penguins hatched per year during the old aquarium years, and 18 new penguins hatched per year during the 2019 breeding season.

In 2019, Chubut Province, Argentina, the habitat of the Magellanic penguin, was designated by the government as Japan's first "ex situ critical breeding site" for Magellanic penguins.

Sumida Aquarium, located within Tokyo Skytree, provided ten penguins for the aquarium's opening during the time of the former Aquatic Museum.

=== Umigatari Tank ===
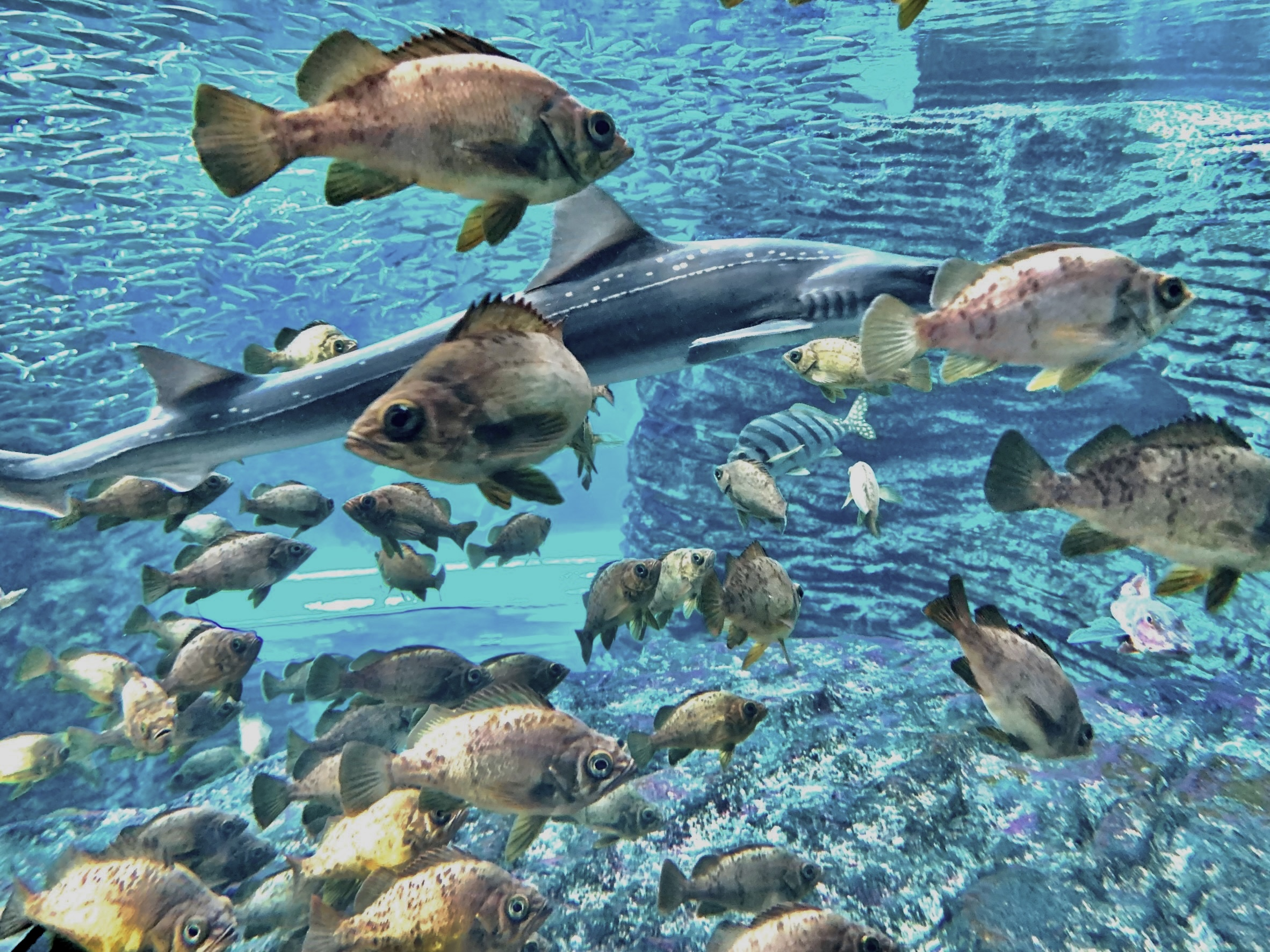
Umigatari tank

Umigatari Tank is a large tank is shaped like the seafloor topography off the Sea of Japan, read with a 3D tool to reproduce the Sea of Japan with fake rocks.

The 360-degree acrylic shark tunnel at the bottom of the aquarium is designed to resemble the Toyama Deep-sea Hase, which runs along the bottom of the Sea of Japan.

Off the coast of Joetsu, salmon and yellowtail swim together in the aquarium, because salmon migrate in the frigid zone and yellowtail migrate in the temperate zone.

== Incidents ==
=== Continuous dolphin deaths ===
Since the sudden death of Sasha, a bottlenose dolphin, shortly after the aquarium's grand opening, four of the six cetaceans brought into Umigatari have died in just over two years since, including Aruk and Sorya, and beluga whale Riya.

In response, Joetsu City decided to establish a third-party verification committee of experts. The verification would be conducted from the three perspectives of breeding, construction, and water quality, and a total of five experts from each were selected. Three meetings were held on August 7 and November 29, 2020, and January 23, 2021. The report was released on February 10.

The report concluded that stress brought to light factors inherent in each individual that led to their deaths. In addition to the difference in climate between Yokohama and Joetsu, it was assumed that the stress was caused by inadequate body preparation for the season due to the constant water temperature and exposure to the climate in Joetsu, where the effects of low and high temperatures are relatively large, and where there is a large difference in cold temperatures.

In terms of architecture, it was pointed out that the structure of the pool, open to the elements, which is its most important feature, may have magnified the effects of the climate. Since the pool is open to the sea, it was thought that strong winter winds blew directly into the pool, adversely affecting the animals involved. Sunlight from the open ceiling and snowfall were also considered to have had an effect.

In terms of water quality, the committee concluded that the quality of the rearing water was not considered to have affected the cause of mortality.

The incident caused controversy and was heavily criticized by animal rights groups. In light of the above, the Verification Committee recommended that the city renovate the facility and strengthen health management in line with Joetsu's climate, and the city implemented immediate measures accordingly. There are also plans to renovate the facility through the fiscal year budget.

The report made 17 recommendations to prevent similar incidents from happening. The aquarium lowered the water level by one meter to counter strong winds to prevent sudden changes in the environment, and also installed a 13-meter-wide awning to reduce the rise in temperature near the water's surface. The effect of the sunshade was evident, with a maximum temperature of 33.5°C recorded, while the difference between sun and shade near the water surface was observed to be up to 3°C. Joetsu City reported at the 2021 council meeting that the two banded dolphins present are in good health.

Subsequently, in an effort to further reduce winter winds, a windbreak net approximately 20 meters wide and 1.7 meters high was installed on the north face of the dolphin pool and a glass windbreak wall was installed on the west face railing. Regarding the effectiveness of the measures, wind speed and temperature on the stage and on the water surface of the dolphin pool are measured daily, and the Education and General Affairs Division of the City Board of Education said, “Based on the measurement results, we will seek advice from experts and take action".

== Gallery ==
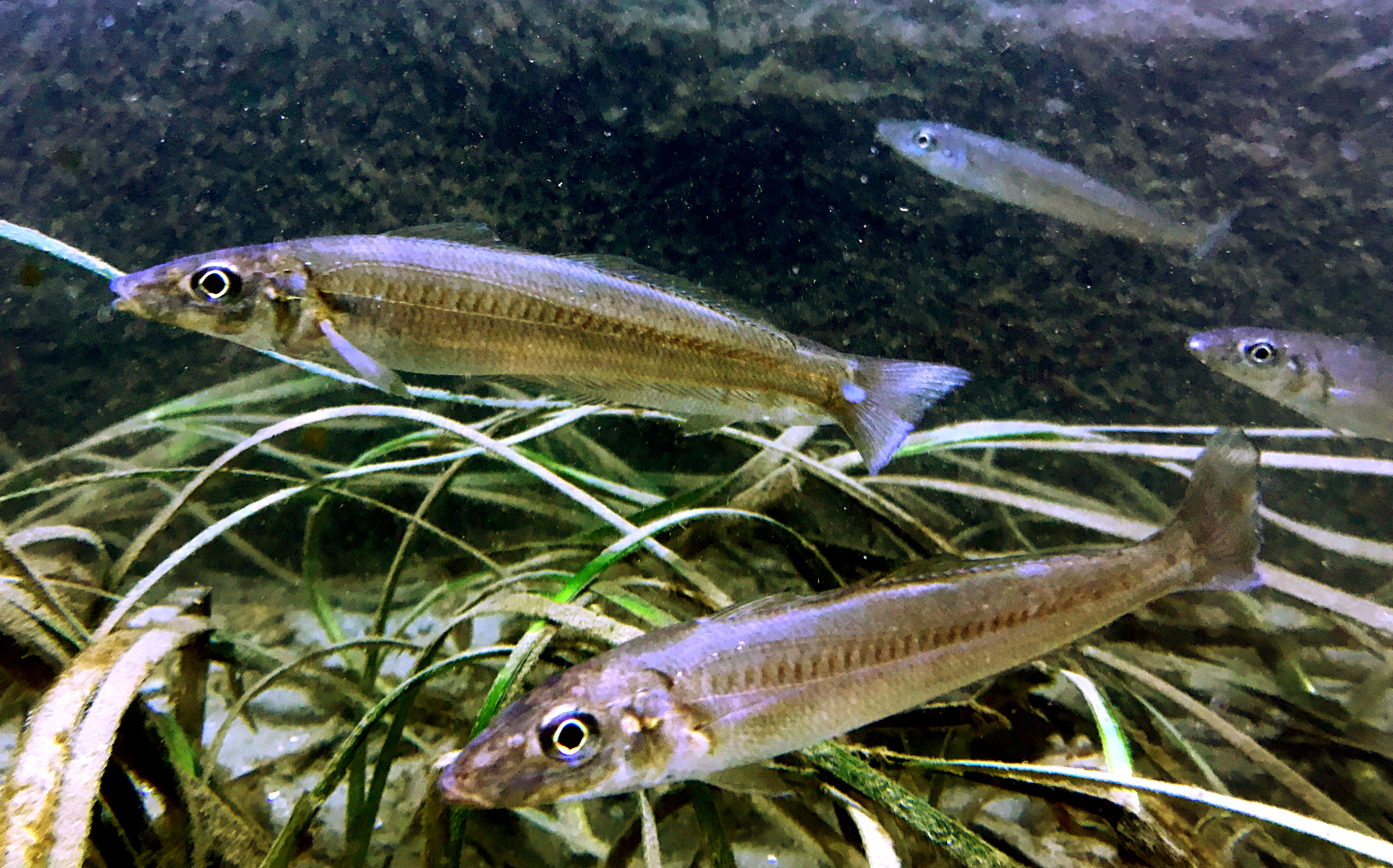

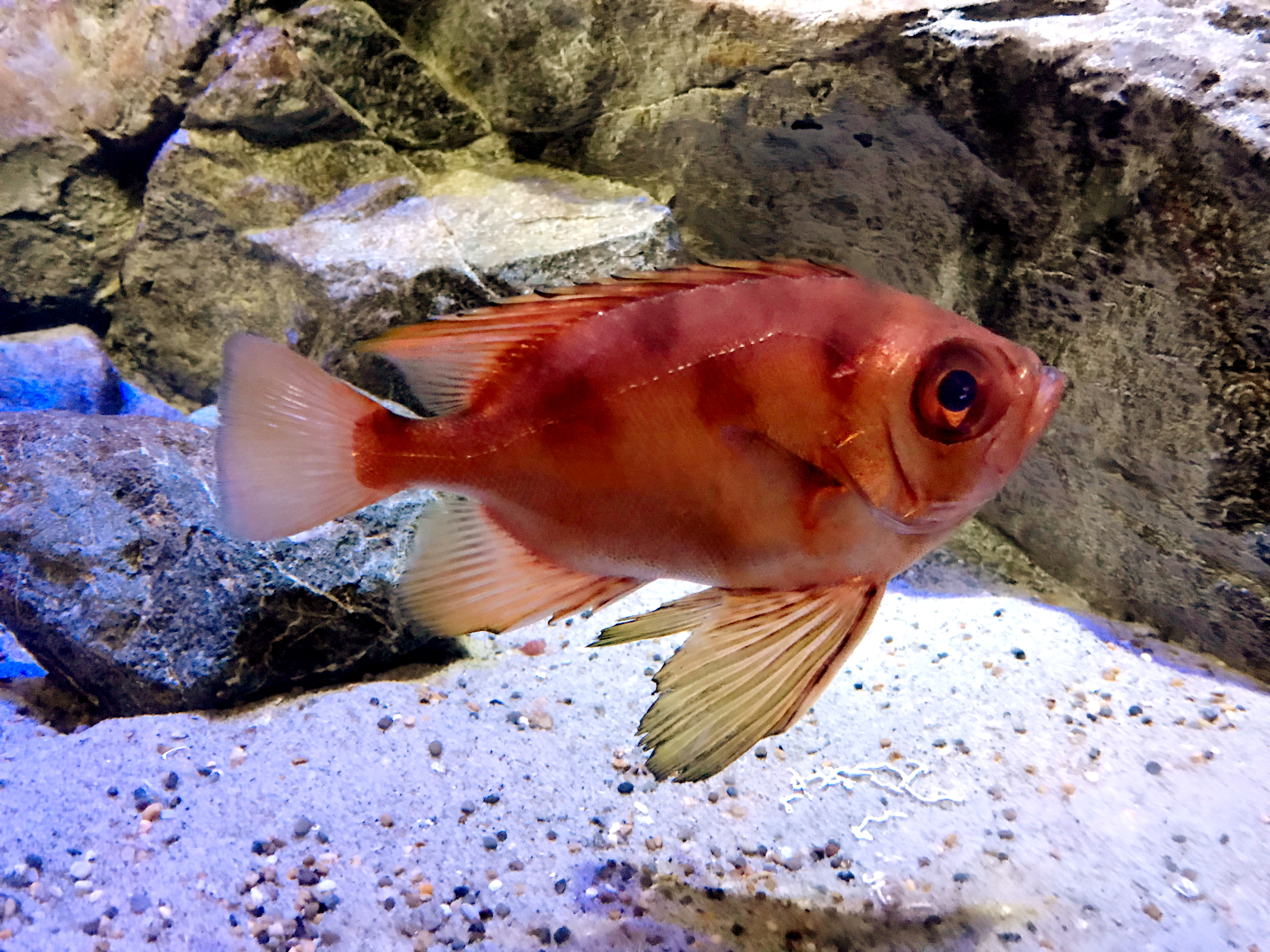

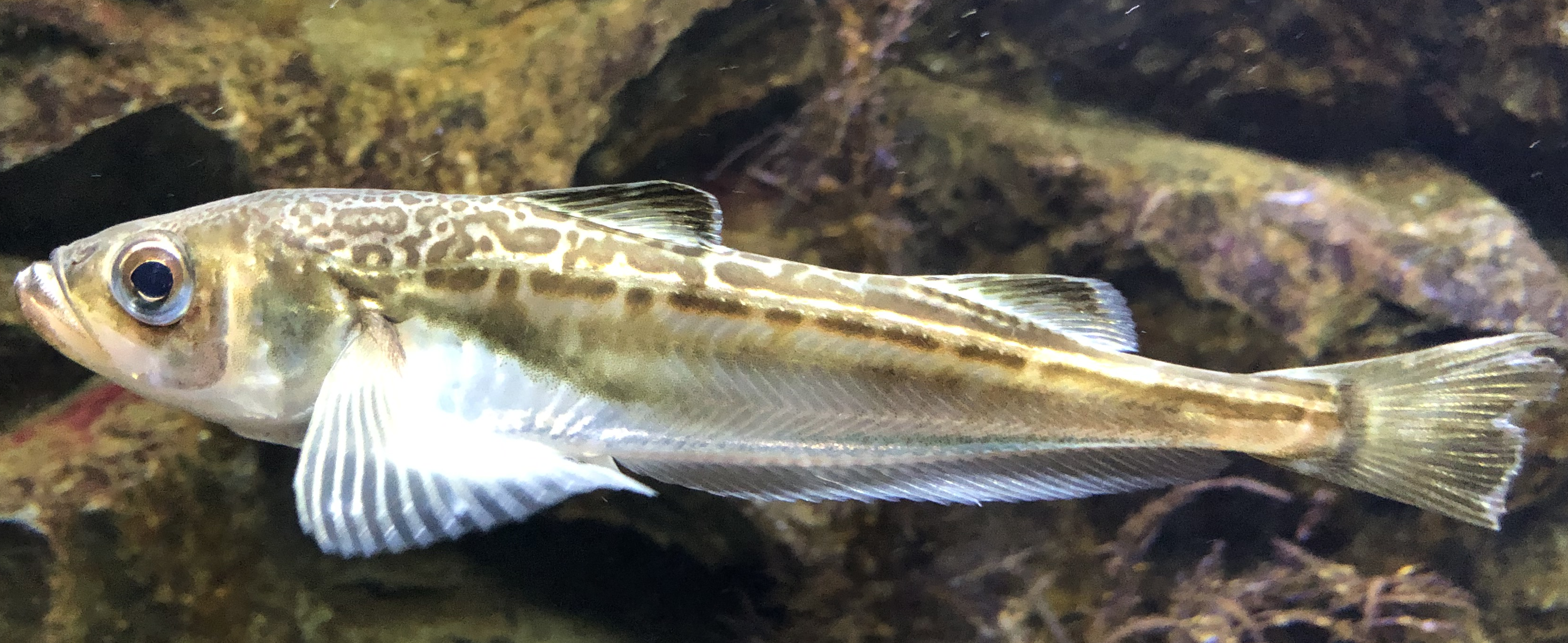

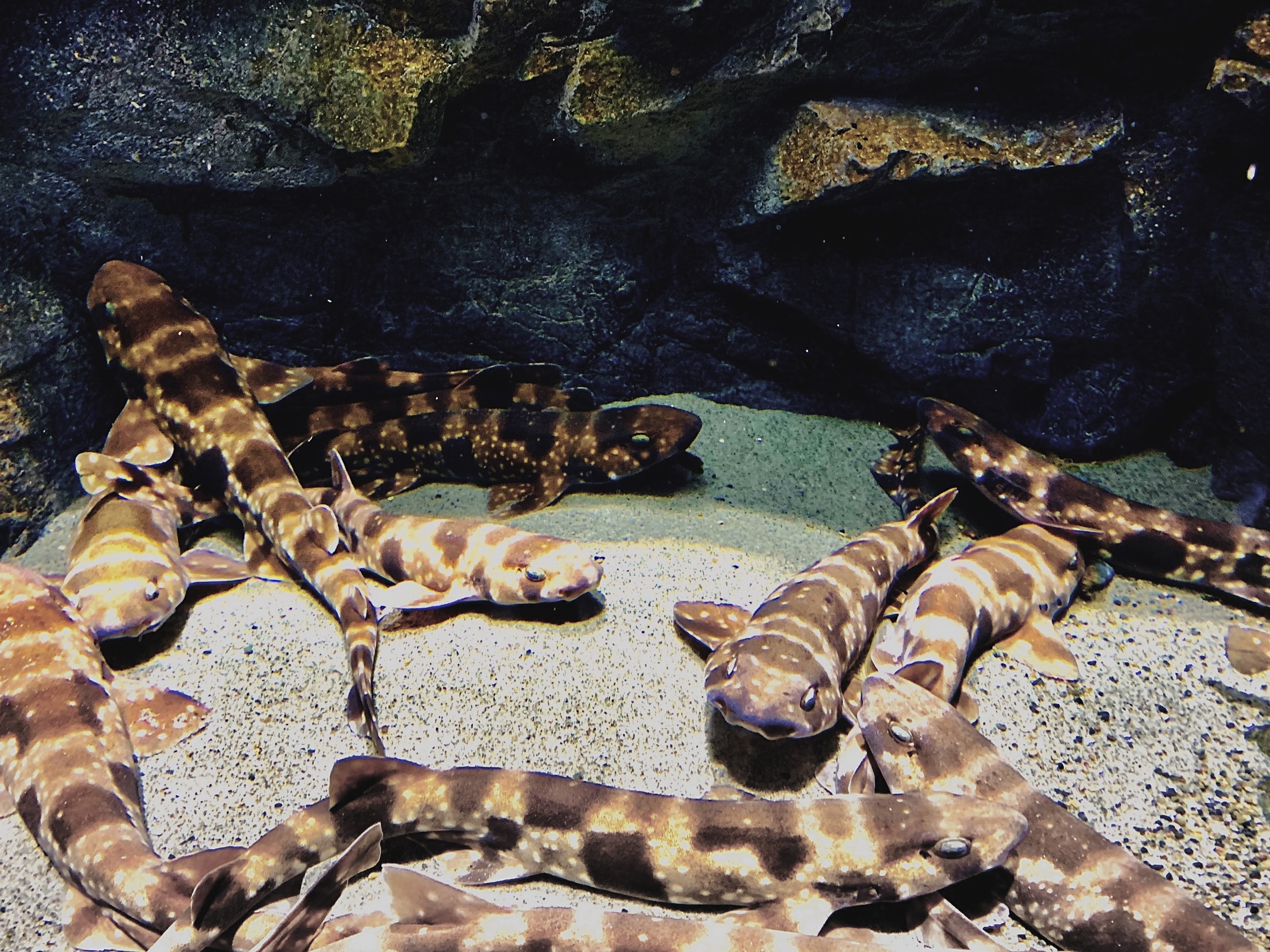

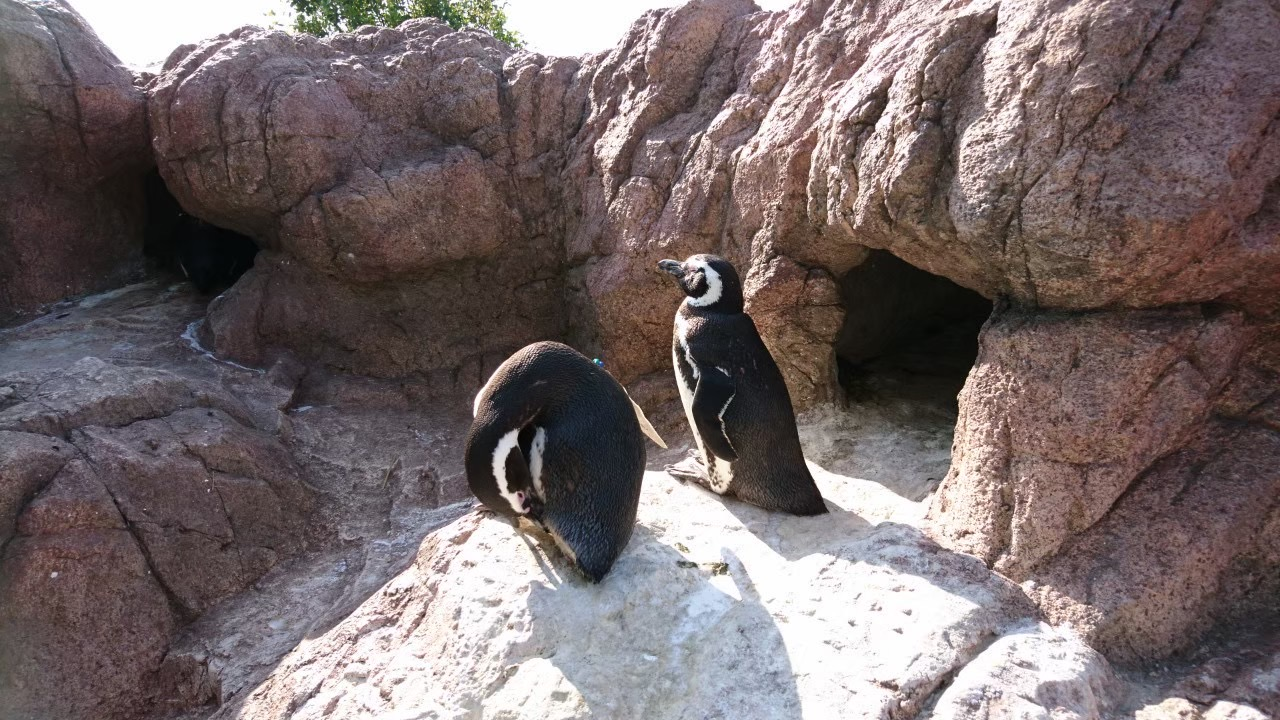

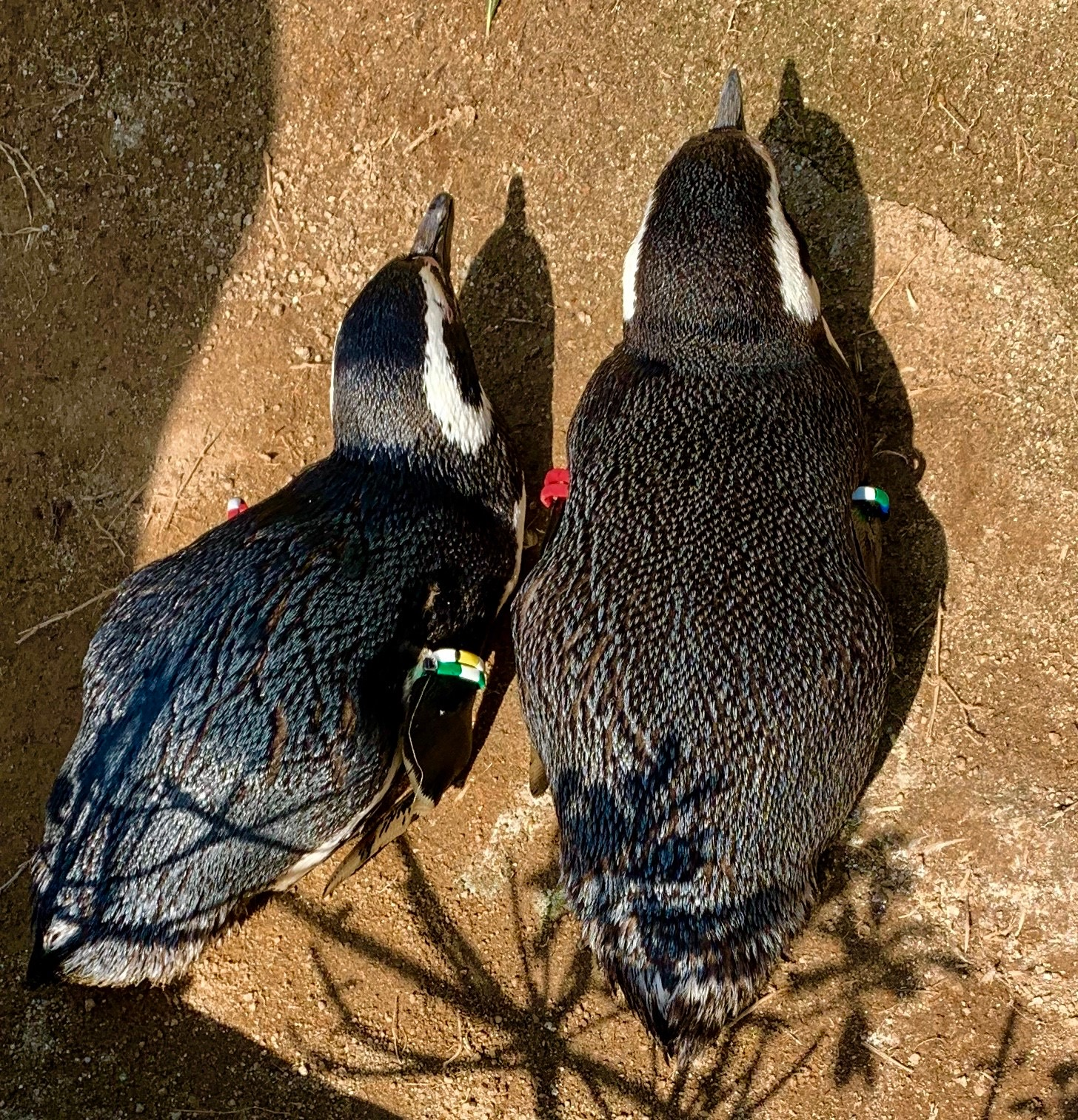

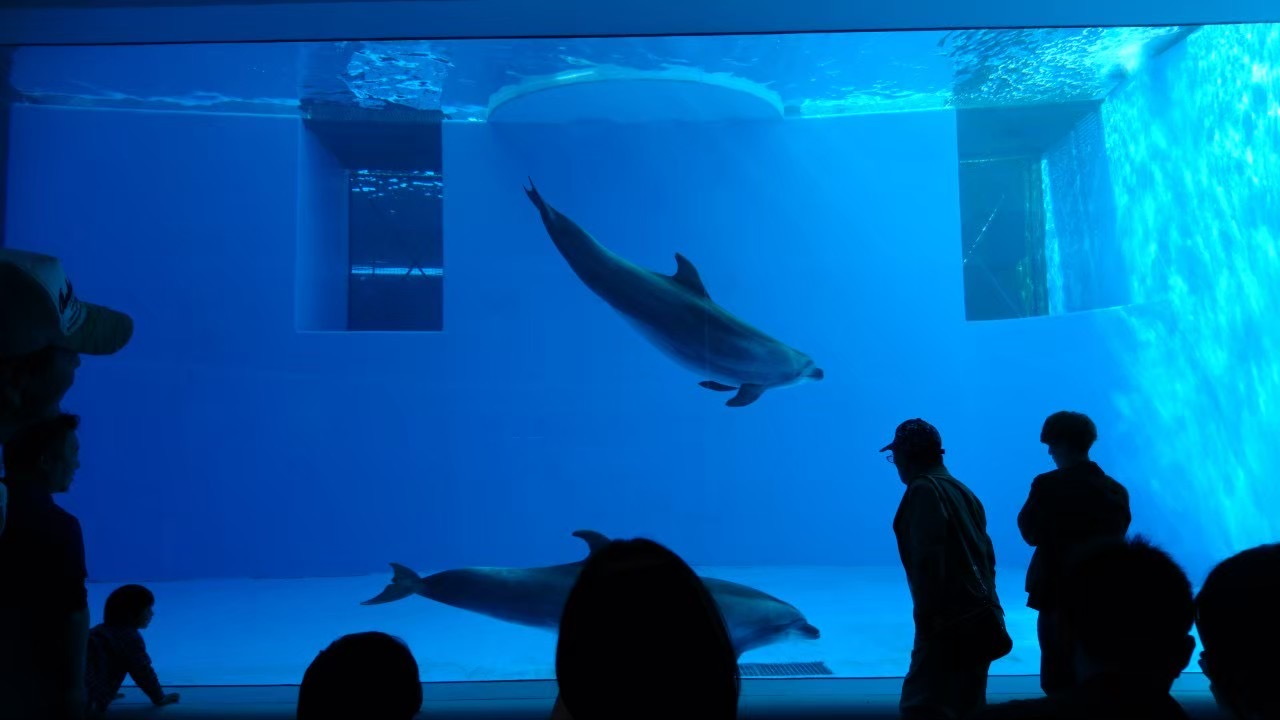

== See also ==
  - Yokohama Hakkeijima Sea Paradise
  - Aqua Park Shinagawa
  - Sendai Umino-Mori Aquarium
  - Xpark
  - Itabashi Botanical Garden
