= Streptococcus parauberis =

Scientific classification
- Domain: Bacteria
- Kingdom: Bacillati
- Phylum: Bacillota
- Class: Bacilli
- Order: Lactobacillales
- Family: Streptococcaceae
- Genus: Streptococcus
- Species: S. parauberis

Binomial name
- Streptococcus parauberis Williams & Collins, 1990

Species of bacterium

Streptococcus parauberis is a species of gram-positive, coccus-shaped, facultatively anaerobic bacteria in the genus Streptococcus. This species is associated with bovine mastitis in dairy cows and infectious disease in aquaculture species, particularly olive flounder.

== Taxonomy ==
Streptococcus parauberis was originally included as a distinct genotype within Streptococcus uberis. In 1990, 16S rRNA gene sequence analysis on isolates recovered from cows with mastitis in the United Kingdom demonstrated that the species was sufficiently divergent to be classified as a new species. The species name "parauberis" reflects its close relationship to Streptococcus uberis.

== Description ==
Streptococcus parauberis are gram-positive, catalase-negative, nonmotile bacteria. On blood agar, colonies are small, smooth, and convex. Colonies may be alpha-hemolytic or non-hemolytic. S. parauberis is able to hydrolyze aesculin. S. parauberis and S. uberis are biochemically similar and the two species are difficult to differentiate through conventional culture methods.

=== Serology ===
Streptococcus parauberis can be divided into five serotypes based on capsular polysaccharide (cps) gene diversity: I, II, III, IV, and V. A multiplex PCR assay has been developed to differentiate the serotypes. Serotype I and II were first isolated in olive flounder in South Korea and Japan. Serotype III was isolated from fish in Spain and the United States.

Serotype distribution varies geographically and among host species, making serological characterization important for epidemiological surveillance and disease control in aquaculture. Serotyping may also inform vaccine development, as candidate vaccine strains are often selected to reflect the serotypes circulating within a particular region or fish population.

== Bovine mastitis ==
Streptococcus parauberis has been isolated from cases of bovine matitis, an inflammatory disease of the mammary gland in dairy cattle. Transmission of this bacteria often occurs during milking. Prevention is preferred to treatment because lactating glands have compromised immune function.

Streptococcus parauberis has also been detected in bovine milk samples, although not as frequently as S. uberis.

== Aquaculture ==
Streptococcus parauberis is also a significant pathogen in aquaculture and has been associated with streptococcosis in several fish species, including olive flounder (Paralichthys olivaceus) and turbot. Infected fish may present with bilateral exopthalmic eyes and rotten gills. Other clinical signs of S. parauberis infection included darkened body coloration and cachexia.

=== Treatment ===
Antibiotics are the most effective treatment method for bacterial infections in farmed fish. Antibiotic absorption rates and effects vary across fish species and optimal dosing should be considered in order to minimize the development of resistance. Antibiotics reported to have activity against S. parauberis infections in aquaculture include tylosin, amoxicillin, and lincomycin. However, antibiotic resistance in S. parauberis is rising, particularly to erythromycin and tetracycline.

Phage therapy has also been investigated as a potential alternative to antibiotics in aquaculture. In 2017, a bacteriophage designated Stre-PAP-1 was isolated and characterized for activity against S. parauberis. This phage was found to be effective in both treatment and prevention of streptococcosis caused by S. parauberis.
