= Lactococcus garvieae =

Scientific classification
- Domain: Bacteria
- Kingdom: Bacillati
- Phylum: Bacillota
- Class: Bacilli
- Order: Lactobacillales
- Family: Streptococcaceae
- Genus: Lactococcus
- Species: L. garvieae

Binomial name
- Lactococcus garvieae (Collins et al., 1984) Schleifer et al., 1986

Species of bacterium

Lactococcus garvieae is a species of gram-positive bacteria from the family Streptococcaceae. L. garvieae is a known fish pathogen affecting saltwater fish in the Far East, specifically in rainbow trout, Japanese yellowtail, cobia (Rachycentron canadum) and grey mullet (Mugil cephalus). This bacteria causes lesions in the vascular endothelium, leading to hemorrhages and petechias at the surface of internal organs. As few as 10 bacterial cells per fish can cause an infection. L. garvieae is isolated in saltwater fish in the Far East and specifically in European rainbow trout.

== Host range ==
Lactococcus garvieae is usually identified within aquatic species, but it has also been found in subclinical intramammary infections in cattle, subclinical mastitis in water buffalo, poultry meat, raw cow's milk, meat products, porcine blood from industrial abattoirs, and cat and dog tonsils. A case of endocarditis in a patient with a mitral valve replacement has been reported. Rare cases have occurred involving infection in humans with a 25% mortality rate.

== History ==
Lactococcus garvieae was first discovered in rainbow trout raised on a Japanese fish farm in the 1950s. The species was formally described by Collins et al. in 1984. In 1988, L. garvieae was identified in the rainbow trout from Spanish fish farms, as well. In later years, it was isolated from several septicemic processes in fish and phenotypical and molecular taxonomic studies confirmed the same agent as E. seriolicida. This species was reclassified as a junior synonym of L. garvieae.

== Culture and morphology ==
Lactococcus garvieae is a facultatively anaerobic, nonmotile, nonspore forming, Gram-positive, ovoid coccus, occurring in pairs and short chains. It can produce α-hemolysis on blood agar (BA). It has the ability to grow at 4.0-45 °C in media containing 6.5% sodium chloride at pH 9.6. Its optimal growth temperature is 37 °C for a 24‑hour period, while at 4 °C, it needs between 12 and 15 days for premium growth. It also grows rapidly in rich media, such as brain heart infusion agar (BHIA), trypticase soy agar, BA, trypticase soy broth, and bile esculin agar. Conversely, L. garvieae does not grow on McConkey agar or Enterococcus agar. Optimum conditions for colony growth exists within brain heart infusion broth, where conditions include a pH range of 7-8 and a temperature range of 25-30 °C.

== Epidemiology ==
In fish models, all clinical forms of lactococcosis show an absence of clinical symptoms and mortalities in fish weighing under 80 g. Smaller fish can be infected experimentally. In a follow-up study of the pathogenicity of L. garvieae, younger fish at 50 g underwent a higher mortality than older fish around 100 g and the acute period of the disease was reported to be longer in young fish.

Numerous investigations of L. garvieae pathogenicity have confirmed that capsulated strains, commonly classified as serotype KG−, are more virulent than noncapsulated strains, commonly classified as serotype KG+. The appearance of the disease is affected specifically by factors of the aquatic environment such as temperature and water quality.

Water temperature affects the disease seasonally as the weather changes. Infection is linked to water temperatures over 18 °C, although acute outbreaks have been discovered in water temperatures of 14–15 °C.

Low water quality caused by poor sanitary conditions has been shown to influence evolution of infection. The disease becomes more distinct when the immediate aquatic environment is poor, and oxygen deficiency increases virulence of the agent. Likewise, excessive ammonium concentration causes an increase in mortality of fish.

== Virulence ==
Several virulence experiments have been performed to determine the possible correlation between pathogenicity of L. garvieae in rainbow trout and the two antigenic profiles (KG- and KG+). The results revealed that capsulated strains (KG-) were more virulent than noncapsulated (KG+), showing LD_{50} values as low as 102 bacteria per fish. The KG− type strain was more virulent than the KG+; when the surface morphologies of the KG− and KG+ phenotypes were differentiated by scanning electron microscopy, KG− cells were found to be more hydrophilic than KG+ cells. The immune response of Japanese yellowtail following injection of the two phenotypes varied with higher adhering titers in the KG+ phenotype compared to the KG-.

Successively, 24 isolates of L. garvieae from different fish species and geographic origin were studied by slide cohesion tests conducted using rabbit antisera against representative strains with diverse origins and by Dot blot assays. These results endorsed the establishment of two different groups of isolates, but a correlation between serological group and geographic origin or host source could not be determined.

Barnes and Ellis serologically compared 17 geographically distinct strains of L. garvieae isolated from diseased rainbow trout, finding that sera raised against capsule-deficient isolates did not agglutinate capsulated isolates, whereas all antisera against capsulated strains cross-reacted with noncapsulated isolates. The results determine that L. garvieae can be differentiated serologically into three different serotypes - a European capsulated serotype, a Japanese capsulated serotype, and a noncapsulated serotype from both the European and Japanese regions.

The comparative analysis of genomes of a virulent strain Lg2 (KG-) and a nonvirulent strain ATCC 49156 (KG+) of L. garvieae revealed that the two strains shared a high degree of sequence identity, but Lg2 had a 16.5 kb capsule gene cluster that is absent in ATCC 49156. The capsule gene cluster of Lg2 may be a genomic island from several features such as the presence of insertion sequences flanked on both ends, different GC content from the chromosomal average, integration into the locus syntenic to other lactococcal genome sequences, and distribution in human gut microbiomes.

== Signs and symptoms in fish ==
In fish, the incubation period of L. garvieae is very brief and the microorganism performs with high virulence. In an experimental infection by intraperitoneal route in Japanese yellowtail, it caused symptoms 2–3 days post-inoculation, while intramuscular infection in grey mullet (Mugil cephalus) produced its first symptoms and fatalities two days post-inoculation. Correspondingly, intraperitoneal experimental infection in rainbow trout caused the first symptoms and deaths three days post-inoculation. Warm water lactococcosis has been detected in a variety of host organisms, including cage cultured cobia, grey mullet, freshwater prawn and Tilapia.

The gross pathology of lactococcosis arises with the presence of a rapid and general anorexia, melanosis, lethargy, loss of orientation, and irregular swimming. Typical external symptoms include exophthalmia and the presence of hemorrhages in the periorbital and intraocular area, the base of fins, the perianal region, the opercula, and the buccal region. In further studies, swollen abdomens and anal prolapsus have been observed. Due to infection, fish have produced lesions in the vascular endothelium that cause blood extravasation, leading to hemorrhages and petechiae at the surface of internal organs. The main organs affected are the spleen, liver, brain, stomach, kidney, and heart.

Macroscopic lesions in affected fish are typical of acute systemic disease with strong congestion in the internal organs and different levels of hemorrhages in the swim bladder, intestine, liver, peritoneum, spleen, and kidney. Also, enlargement of the spleen, focal areas of necrosis in the liver and spleen, pericarditis, hemorrhagic fluid in the intestine, and yellowish exudate covering the brain surface are typically observed.

Histopathology is found mainly in the eyes and internal organs' capsules. Lesions on the ocular area consist of extensive fibroplasias with inflammatory cells penetration. In the brain, lesions exist in the cerebrum and cerebellum. Diseased fish typically show signs of acute meningitis, consisting of an exudate covering the brain surface. In the heart, lesions are usually signified by fibroplasias, macrophage, and lymphocytes. In kidneys, the renal tubules have hyaline droplet deposition in the epithelia and hyaline casts in the lumen.

== World impact of fish infection ==
According to a series of studies in 2006, L. garvieae is an emerging pathogen that is causing significant economic losses both in marine and freshwater aquaculture when water temperature increases over 16 °C in summer. This pathogen causes serious economic losses due to three main factors; elevated rates of mortality have been investigated at 50% of fish, a decrease in the growth rates of fish due to infection, and unpleasant appearance of the infected fish which makes them unmarketable to consumers.

== Eradication in fish ==
Several vaccines have been developed to tackle L. garvieae infection in the face of rising antibiotic resistance, with whole-cell killed cells being the most common.

== Human pathogen ==
Lactococcus garvieae in humans is a rare pathogen and of low virulence. More than 31 cases of infection in humans have been reported. These include 25 cases of endocarditis and other infections like those related to peritoneal dialysis catheters, discitis, catheter associated UTI, post TURP infection, liver abscess in a patient with cholangiocarcinoma, and AICD/pacemaker related infections to name a few.

The signs and symptoms of United States cases include urinary tract, blood, skin, and pneumonic processes. In Canada, patients have been found with bacterial endocarditis. Infection is thought to have followed the consumption of fresh seafood and is believed to be facilitated by immunosuppression or liver cirrhosis. A patient with L. garvieae septicaemia in absence of infective endocarditis was successfully treated with a combination of ampicillin and gentamicin and showed a favourable clinical course. Antibiotic therapy adapted to the antibiogram (levofloxacin, amoxicillin, and clavulanic acid) for eight weeks and an oral anticoagulative therapy for three months.

Bacterial endocarditis from L. garvieae is extremely rare and may actually be under-reported due to its morphologic and biochemical similarities with enterococci. The source of infection in many L. garvieae-infected patients is unclear, where similar cases were identified and patients denied having contact with domestic animals or fish, or eating raw fish, milk, or meat and dairy products. However, a few cases had known diverticulitis of the colon, which could provide a point of entry for L. garvieae infection.
