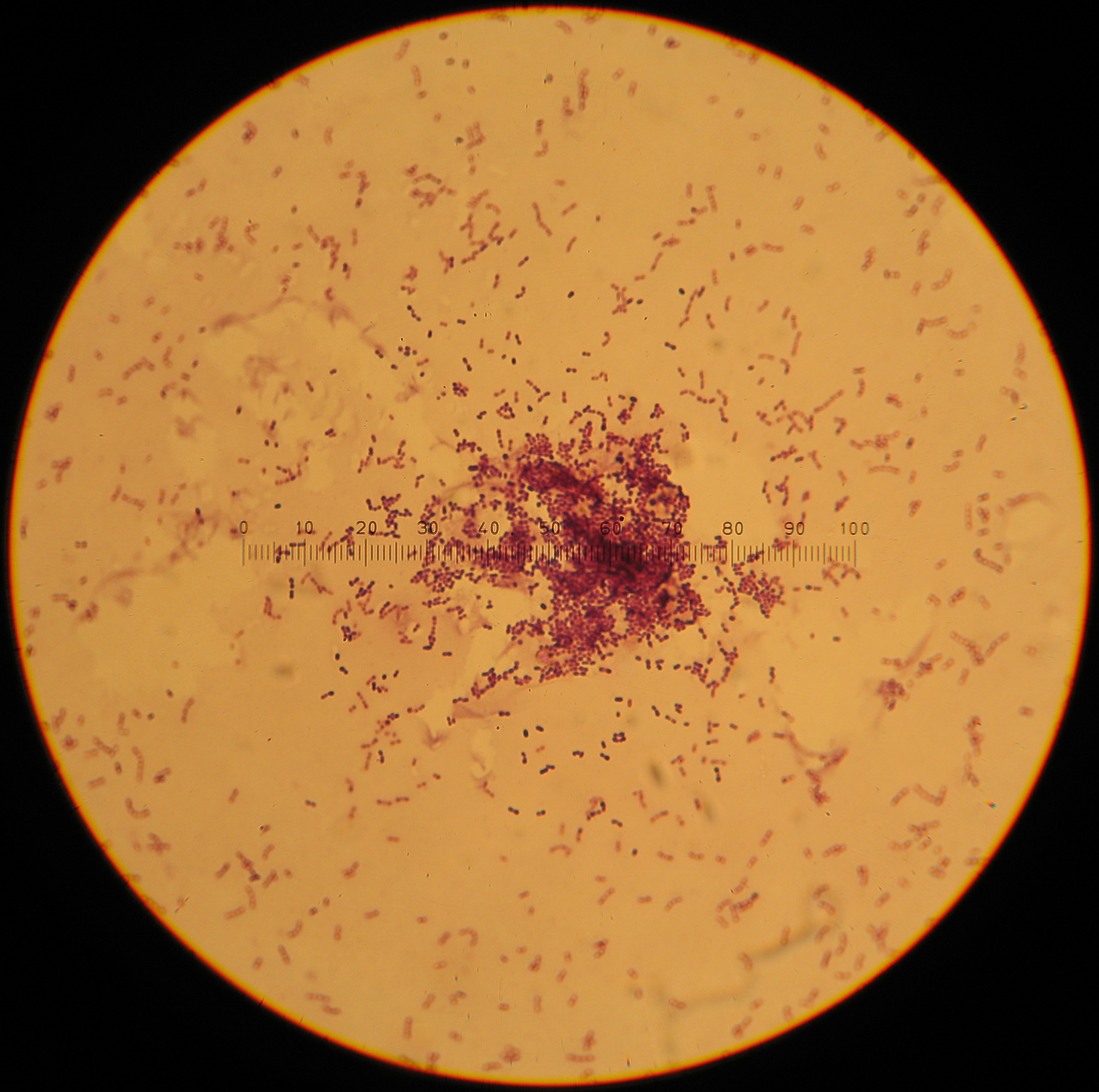
- Lactococcus lactis

Scientific classification
- Domain: Bacteria
- Kingdom: Bacillati
- Phylum: Bacillota
- Class: Bacilli
- Order: Lactobacillales
- Family: Streptococcaceae
- Genus: Lactococcus; Schleifer et al. 1986

Type species
- Lactococcus lactis (Lister 1873) Schleifer et al. 1986

Species
- See text

= Lactococcus =

Genus of bacteria

Lactococcus, from Latin lac, meaning "milk", and Ancient Greek κόκκος (kókkos), meaning "berry", is a genus of lactic acid bacteria that were formerly classified as Lancefield group N streptococci. They are known as homofermenters meaning that they produce a single product, lactic acid in this case, as the major or only product of glucose fermentation. Their homofermentative character can be altered by adjusting environmental conditions such as pH, glucose concentration, and nutrient limitation. They are gram-positive, catalase-negative, non-motile cocci that are found singly, in pairs, or in chains. The genus contains strains known to grow at or below 7˚C.

== Taxonomy ==
The type species of the genus is Lactococcus lactis. The List of Prokaryotic names with Standing in Nomenclature (LPSN) recognizes 16 species with validly published and correct names in Lactococcus:

- Lactococcus allomyrinae
- Lactococcus cremoris
- Lactococcus formosensis
- Lactococcus fujiensis
- Lactococcus garvieae
- Lactococcus hircilactis
- Lactococcus ileimucosae
- Lactococcus kimchii
- Lactococcus lactis
- Lactococcus muris
- Lactococcus nasutitermitis
- Lactococcus petauri
- Lactococcus protaetiae
- Lactococcus reticulitermitis
- Lactococcus taiwanensis
- Lactococcus termiticola

Lactococcus intestinalis is treated as a later heterotypic synonym of L. muris.

A genome-based revision divided the genus into two phylogenetic groups and introduced the genus Pseudolactococcus for one of them. Although Pseudolactococcus was validly published, LPSN currently treats it as a heterotypic synonym of Lactococcus.

== Uses ==
These organisms are commonly used in the dairy industry in the manufacture of fermented dairy products such as cheeses. They can be used in single-strain starter cultures, or in mixed-strain cultures with other lactic acid bacteria such as Lactobacillus and Streptococcus. Special interest is placed on the study of L. lactis subsp. lactis and L. lactis subsp. cremoris, as they are the strains used as starter cultures in industrial dairy fermentations. Their main purpose in dairy production is the rapid acidification of milk; this causes a drop in the pH of the fermented product, which prevents the growth of spoilage bacteria. The bacteria also play a role in the flavor of the final product. Lactococci are currently being used in the biotechnology industry. They are easily grown at industrial scale on whey-based media. As food-grade bacteria, they are used in the production of foreign proteins that are applied to the food industry.

== Diseases ==
Lactococcosis refers to a group of disorders caused by the bacterium L. garvieae. Most "Lacto" species dwell on the bodies of humans and animals, and while they do not cause serious problems in higher animals, they do cause chronic illnesses in lower animals, particularly fish.
