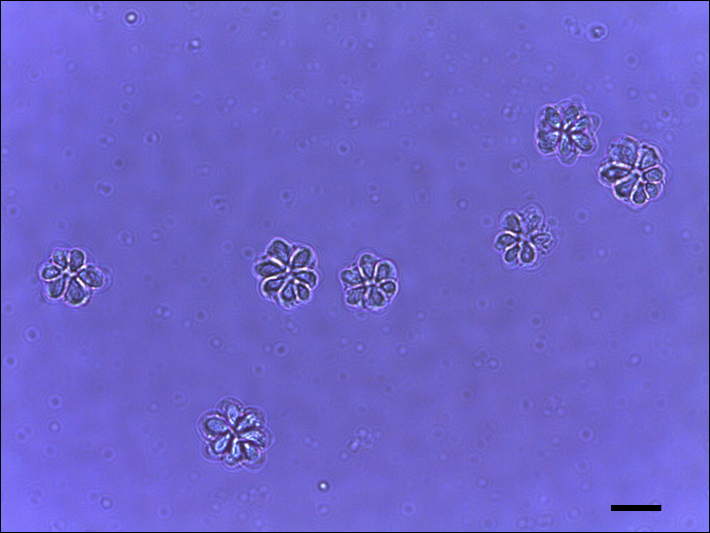
- Kudoa septempunctata - spores

Scientific classification
- Kingdom: Animalia
- Phylum: Cnidaria
- Class: Myxosporea
- Order: Multivalvulida; Shulman, 1959

= Multivalvulida =

Order of marine parasites

Multivalvulida is an order of myxozoan parasitic animals.

== Families ==
There are currently three recognized families within the order:

- Kudoidae
- Spinavaculidae
- Trilosporidae
