= Gadimyxa atlantica =

Scientific classification
- Kingdom: Animalia
- Phylum: Cnidaria
- Class: Myxosporea
- Order: Bivalvulida
- Family: Parvicapsulidae
- Genus: Gadimyxa
- Species: G. atlantica

Binomial name
- Gadimyxa atlantica Køie, Karlsbakk & Nylund, 2007

Species of marine parasite

Gadimyxa atlantica is a species of parasitic myxozoan. Together with G. arctica and G. sphaerica, they infect Gadus morhua and Arctogadus glacialis by developing coelozoically in bisporic plasmodia in their urinary systems. These 3 species' spores exhibit two morphological forms: wide and subspherical, being both types bilaterally symmetrical along the suture line. The wide spores have a mean width ranging from 7.5-10μm, respectively, while the subspherical ones range from 5.3-8μm in mean width. The subspherical forms of Gadimyxa are similar to Ortholinea, differing in the development of the spores and in the arrangement of the polar capsules. Polychaetes Spirorbisspecies act as invertebrate hosts of G. atlantica.
