= Gadimyxa arctica =

Scientific classification
- Kingdom: Animalia
- Phylum: Cnidaria
- Class: Myxosporea
- Order: Bivalvulida
- Family: Parvicapsulidae
- Genus: Gadimyxa
- Species: G. arctica

Binomial name
- Gadimyxa arctica Køie, Karlsbakk & Nylund, 2007

Species of marine parasite

Gadimyxa arctica is a species of parasitic myxozoan. Together with G. atlantica and G. sphaerica, they infect Gadus morhua and Arctogadus glacialis by developing coelozoically in bisporic plasmodia in their urinary systems. These 3 species' spores exhibit two morphological forms: wide and subspherical, being both types bilaterally symmetrical along the suture line. The wide spores have a mean width ranging from 7.5-10μm, respectively, while the subspherical ones range from 5.3-8μm in mean width. The subspherical forms of Gadimyxa are similar to Ortholinea, differing in the development of the spores and in the arrangement of the polar capsules.
