= Myxobolus cordeiroi =

Scientific classification
- Domain: Eukaryota
- Kingdom: Animalia
- Phylum: Cnidaria
- Class: Myxosporea
- Order: Bivalvulida
- Family: Myxobolidae
- Genus: Myxobolus
- Species: M. cordeiroi

Binomial name
- Myxobolus cordeiroi Adriano et al., 2009

Species of marine parasite

Myxobolus cordeiroi is a myxozoan parasite of freshwater fish.

== Description ==
The parasite was first described in 2009 by Adriano et al.

The parasite was discovered in the jaú catfish (Zungaro jahu). The plasmodia were found in the connective tissue of the gill arch, skin, serosa of the body cavity, urinary bladder and eye. They were white and round and measured 0.3-2.0mm in diameter. They were surrounded by double layered collagen capsule: the outer layer possessed fibers with distinct orientation from the adjacent connective tissue while the inner layer was composed of more delicate fibrils.

The spores were oval and the spore wall was smooth.

== Hosts ==
The only known host is the jaú catfish (Zungaro jahu).

== Location ==
This parasite is found in Brazil.

== Phylogenetics ==
Because the number of sequences available from this genus is currently (2009) quite limited the taxonomy may be revised in the future. On the basis of the current information the genus is divided into two clades - one infecting freshwater fish and one infecting salt water fish. Myxobolus cordeiroi has been placed near the base of the freshwater clade.
