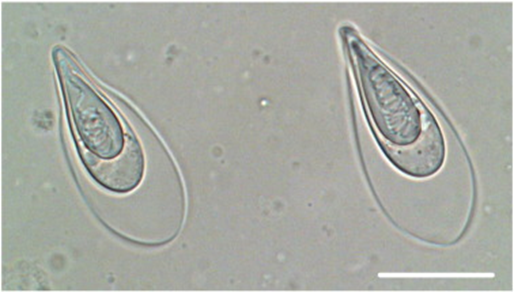
- Fresh myxospores of T. kitauei from a skin smear of common carp; from Zhai et al. 2016; size bar 10 μm.

Scientific classification
- Kingdom: Animalia
- Phylum: Cnidaria
- Class: Myxosporea
- Order: Bivalvulida
- Family: Myxobolidae
- Genus: Thelohanellus
- Species: T. kitauei

Binomial name
- Thelohanellus kitauei Egusa & Nakajima, 1981

Synonyms
- Thelohanellus xinyangensis Xie, Gong, Xiao, Guo, Li et Guo, 2000

= Thelohanellus kitauei =

Parasite of carp

Thelohanellus kitauei is a myxozoan endoparasite identified as the agent of intestinal giant-cystic disease (IGCD) of common carp Cyprinus carpio. The species was first identified in Japan, in 1980 and later formally described by Egusa & Nakajima. Fan subsequently reported the parasite in China, and several other reports from carp and Koi carp in China and Korea followed. Reports referred to an intestinal infection, swelling and emaciation of fish due to blockage of the intestinal tract by giant cysts. The intestine of carp was believed to be the only infection site of T. kitauei until Zhai et al. reported large cysts of T. kitauei in the skin, with morphologically similar and molecularly identical spores. T. kitauei has been recognized as the most detrimental disease of farmed carp in Asia with around 20% of farmed carp killed annually. In 2014, the genome of T. kitauei was sequenced, and in 2016, its life cycle was found to include the oligochaete Branchiura sowerbyi. Infected oligochaete worms were first discovered in Hungary and raised concerns of the introduction of T. kitauei into European carp culture ponds, since it was believed to be endemic to Asia. However, the related disease (IGCD) has not yet been reported in Europe.

== Life cycle ==
The life cycle of T. kitauei involves two hosts. Branchiura sowerbyi (Oligochaeta, Naididae, Branchiurinae) is the definitive host, in which actinosporean spores of the aurantiactinomyxon type are formed and released from the intestinal tract of the worms. These actinospores then infect the intermediate host, common carp, and after parasite multiplication, myxosporean spores are formed in the carp intestine. Myxospores are then released with the faeces of the fish host or after its death, and taken up by B. sowerbyi while feeding on the sediment.

== Pathology and clinical signs ==
The intestines of diseased carp develop large cysts containing spores of T. kitauei. The cyst size ranges from 2 cm to 3.6 cm in diameter. Histopathology indicates that T. kitauei first invades the submucosa of the host intestine and then moves into the mucosa layers where spores are formed, with spores entering the body cavity of the hosts after disruption of mucosa layers. Affected fish stocks can suffer from mortalities reaching 100%. Fish die from starvation as nutrient uptake and passage of food through infected intestines is limited. Infections in the skin cause large, irregular tumour-like lesions bearing cysts with spores. These cause exfoliation of epidermis and the stratum spongiosum.

== Impact ==
In 2010, in China, IGCD led to economic losses of approximately US$50 Million.

== Diagnosis ==
Intestinal cysts are large and easily visible to the naked eye (Fig. 2), cysts on the skin are also large. Myxospores within the cysts should match the descriptions of Egusa & Nakajima, 1981 or Zhai et al. 2016. They are egg-shaped balloon-like sacks, 33.4 μm by 15.0 μm in size on average. 18S rDNA sequences are available on Genbank under the accession numbers KU664644, JQ690367, HM624024, MH329616, KR872638, KU664643, GQ396677, MF536693; genome data is available under the Bioproject accession number PRJNA193083. A qPCR detection assay was developed by Seo et al., but its specificity requires confirmation as closely related species show only minor 18S rDNA sequence divergence.

== Treatments ==
Presently, there are no treatments against myxozoans in fish destined for human consumption.

== Other control strategies ==
No other control strategies have been identified.

== Research ==
Most research on this parasite is performed in Japan, China and Korea, where IGCD affects a large number of carp stocks. Within the EU-funded Horizon 2020 Project ParaFishControl the invertebrate host of T. kitauei was elucidated in Hungary, though this country is thought to be an IGCD-free carp culture area. Ongoing studies within this project investigate the presence of T. kitauei in environmental samples in carp culture ponds in different countries in Europe and focus on detecting a potentially different infection site in fish, as large scale screening of intestines did not reveal T. kitauei infections, even at sites where the parasite was detected in environmental samples.
