= Diseases and parasites in salmon =

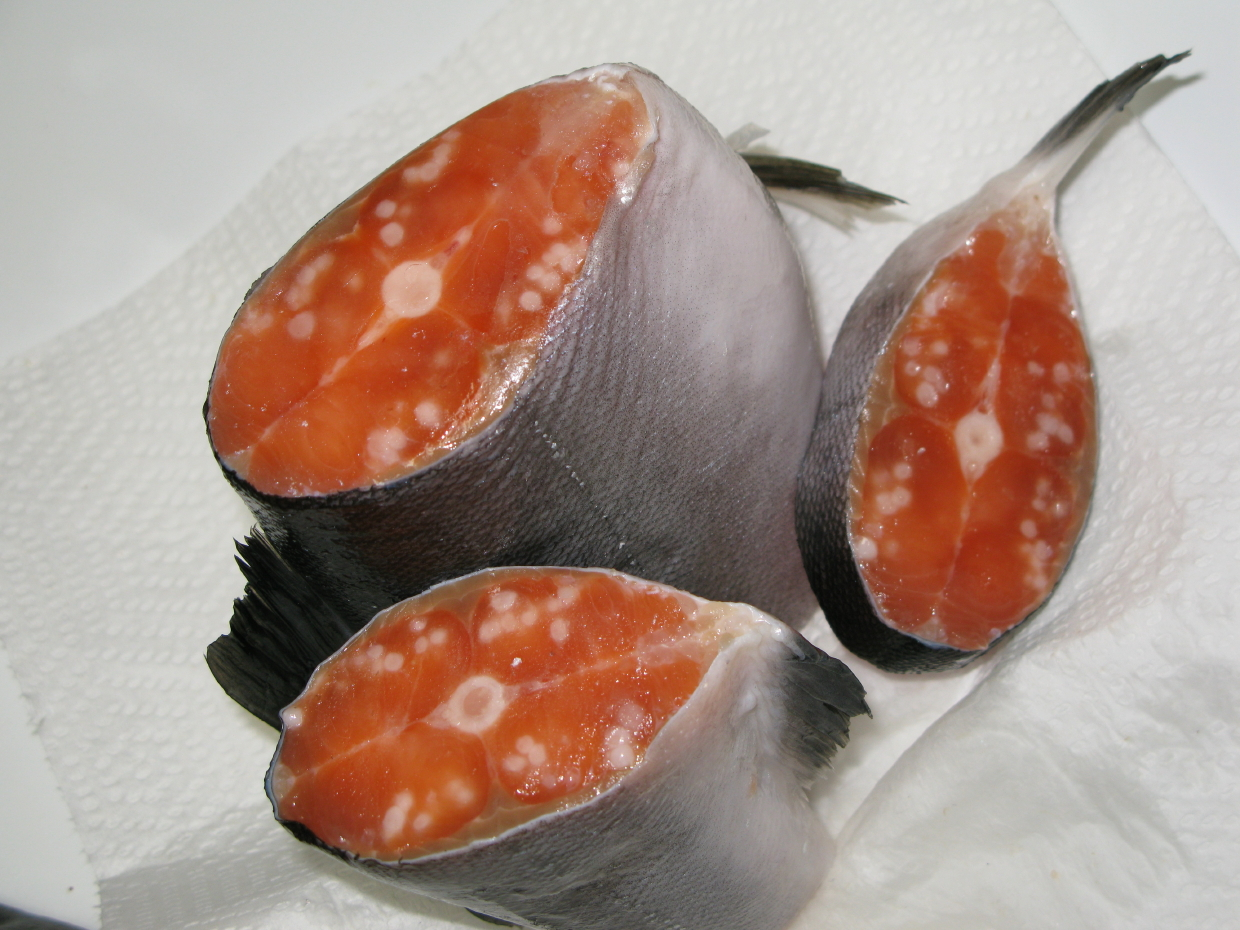
Sample of pink salmon caught off the Queen Charlotte Islands, Western Canada in 2009, infected with Henneguya salminicola

Diseases and parasites in salmon, trout and other salmon-like fishes of the family Salmonidae are also found in other fish species. The life cycle of many salmonids is anadromous, so such fish are exposed to parasites in fresh water, brackish water and saline water.

== Causitive organisms ==
=== Unknown ===
Ulcerative dermal necrosis (UDN) of Atlantic salmon (Salmo salar) was identified as a major cause of disease and death in adult salmon returning to freshwater to spawn in the 1970s and 1980s. It was especially common in the UK but also seen in a number of European countries. The cause of UDN is still unclear although Fusarium infections have been proposed. Infected fish presented with multiple skin lesions which were almost inevitably suffering overgrows of Saprolegnia fungus. Mortality was high with many fish dying before they were able to spawn.

=== Cnidarian parasites ===
Henneguya salminicola, a myxozoan parasite is commonly found in the flesh of Oncorhynchus species. It has been recorded in the field samples of salmon returning to the Queen Charlotte Islands. The fish responds by walling off the parasitic infestation into a number of cysts that contain milky fluid. This fluid is an accumulation of a large number of parasites.

Henneguya and other parasites in the myxosporean group have a complex life cycle where the salmon is one of two hosts. The fish releases the spores after spawning. In the Henneguya case, the spores enter a second host, an invertebrate, in the spawning stream. When juvenile salmon migrate to the Pacific Ocean, the second host releases a stage infective to salmon. The parasite is then carried in the salmon until the next spawning cycle. The myxosporean parasite that causes whirling disease in trout has a similar life cycle. However, as opposed to whirling disease, the Henneguya infestation does not appear to cause significant incapacitation of the host salmon — even heavily infected fish tend to return to spawn successfully.

Work on Henneguya salminicola at the Pacific Biological Station in Nanaimo noted that "the fish that have the longest freshwater residence time as juveniles have the most noticeable infections. Hence in order of prevalence coho are most infected followed by sockeye, chinook, chum and pink." As well, the report says that, at the time the studies were conducted, stocks from the middle and upper reaches of large river systems in British Columbia such as Fraser, Skeena, Nass and from mainland coastal streams in the southern half of B.C. "are more likely to have a low prevalence of infection." The report also states "It should be stressed that Henneguya, economically deleterious though it is, is harmless from the view of public health. It is strictly a fish parasite that cannot live in or affect warm blooded animals, including man".

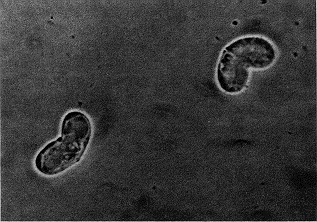
The myxosporean parasite Ceratomyxa shasta infects salmonid fish on the Pacific coast of North America

According to Klaus Schallie, Molluscan Shellfish Program Specialist with the Canadian Food Inspection Agency, "Henneguya salminicola is found in southern B.C. also and in all species of salmon. I have previously examined smoked chum salmon sides that were riddled with cysts and some sockeye runs in Barkley Sound (southern B.C., west coast of Vancouver Island) are noted for their high incidence of infestation."

=== Sea lice ===
In the Pacific, Sea lice, particularly Lepeophtheirus salmonis and various Caligus species, including C. clemensi and C. rogercresseyi, can cause deadly infestations of both farm-grown and wild salmon. Argulus species can have a major impact on Atlantic salmonids, especially caged fish.

Sea lice are ectoparasites which feed on mucus, blood, and skin, and migrate and latch onto the skin of wild salmon during free-swimming, planktonic nauplii and copepodid larval stages, which can persist for several days. Large numbers of highly populated, open-net salmon farms can create exceptionally large concentrations of sea lice; when exposed in river estuaries containing large numbers of open-net farms, many young wild salmon are infected, and do not survive as a result. Adult salmon may survive otherwise critical numbers of sea lice, but small, thin-skinned juvenile salmon migrating to sea are highly vulnerable. On the Pacific coast of Canada, the louse-induced mortality of pink salmon in some regions is commonly over 80%.

=== Flatworms ===
In 1972, Gyrodactylus, a monogenean parasite, spread from Norwegian hatcheries to wild salmon, and devastated some wild salmon populations.

=== Bacteria ===
Enteric redmouth disease is a bacterial infection of freshwater and marine fish caused by the pathogen Yersinia ruckeri. It is primarily found in rainbow trout and other cultured salmonids. The disease is characterized by subcutaneous hemorrhaging of the mouth, fins, and eyes. It is most commonly seen in fish farms with poor water quality. Redmouth disease was first discovered in Idaho rainbow trout in the 1950s.

The bacteria Piscirickettsia salmonis causes the disease piscirickettsiosis, which has a mortality rate as high as 90% in certain salmonid fishes and is ubiquitous on Chilean salmon farms. Infected fish may or may not display external symptoms of infection, but they frequently display ulcers on the liver and kidney and often develop anemia. The disease was first reported in 1989 as coho salmon syndrome.

=== Viral infectious diseases ===
In 1984, infectious salmon anemia (ISAv) was discovered in Norway in an Atlantic salmon hatchery. Eighty percent of the fish in the outbreak died. ISAv, a viral disease, is now a major threat to the viability of Atlantic salmon farming. It is now the first of the diseases classified on List One of the European Commission's fish health regime. Amongst other measures, this requires the total eradication of the entire fish stock should an outbreak of the disease be confirmed on any farm. ISAv seriously affects salmon farms in Chile, Norway, Scotland and Canada, causing major economic losses to infected farms. As the name implies, it causes severe anemia of infected fish. Unlike mammals, the red blood cells of fish have DNA, and can become infected with viruses. The fish develop pale gills, and may swim close to the water surface, gulping for air. However, the disease can also develop without the fish showing any external signs of illness, the fish maintain a normal appetite, and then they suddenly die. The disease can progress slowly throughout an infected farm and, in the worst cases, death rates may approach 100 percent. It is also a threat to the dwindling stocks of wild salmon. Management strategies include developing a vaccine and improving genetic resistance to the disease.

Another infectious virus in salmon is Piscine orthoreovirus. It was first discovered in 2010, present in Atlantic Salmon farms exhibiting high levels of Heart and Skeletal Muscular Inflammation (HSMI) and Cardiomyopathy syndrome (CMS). Since then it has been observed in areas across the globe, such as Great Britain, Chile and across the Pacific Northwest. Whether or not it causes HSMI has been through extensive study. Injection of PRV from into healthy Atlantic Salmon has caused HSMI in Norway, but these results haven't been reproducible on the same species of salmon in farms in British Columbia, despite HSMI being directly linked to PRV in one BC farm. Because of this, numerous researchers have suggested that PRV may be necessary for HSMI, but not sufficient.

== Interaction with humans ==
In the wild, diseases and parasites are normally at low levels, and kept in check by natural predation on weakened individuals. In crowded net pens they can become epidemics. Diseases and parasites also transfer from farmed to wild salmon populations. A recent study in British Columbia links the spread of parasitic sea lice from river salmon farms to wild pink salmon in the same river."

The European Commission (2002) concluded "The reduction of wild salmonid abundance is also linked to other factors but there is more and more scientific evidence establishing a direct link between the number of lice-infested wild fish and the presence of cages in the same estuary." It is reported that wild salmon on the west coast of Canada are being driven to extinction by sea lice from nearby salmon farms. Antibiotics and pesticides are often used to control the diseases and parasites, as well as lasers.

These predictions have been disputed by other scientists and there is much debate on whether the correlation between sea lice infestation and declining wild salmon stocks is driven by causal factors.

== Other conditions ==
Gas bubble disease is caused by contact with supersaturated water.

== Gallery ==
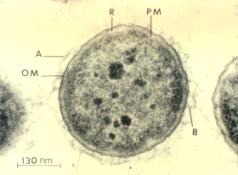
Aeromonas salmonicida, a Gram-negative bacteria, causes the disease furunculosis in marine and freshwater fish.

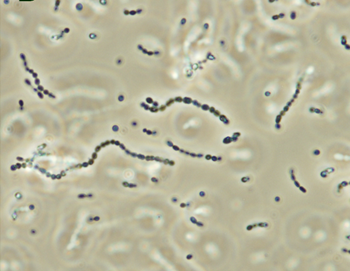
Streptococcus iniae, a Gram-positive, sphere-shaped bacteria caused losses in farmed marine and freshwater finfish of US$100 million in 1997.

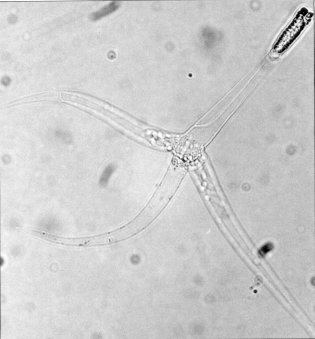
Myxobolus cerebralis, a myxosporean parasite, causes whirling disease in farmed salmon and trout and also in wild fish populations.

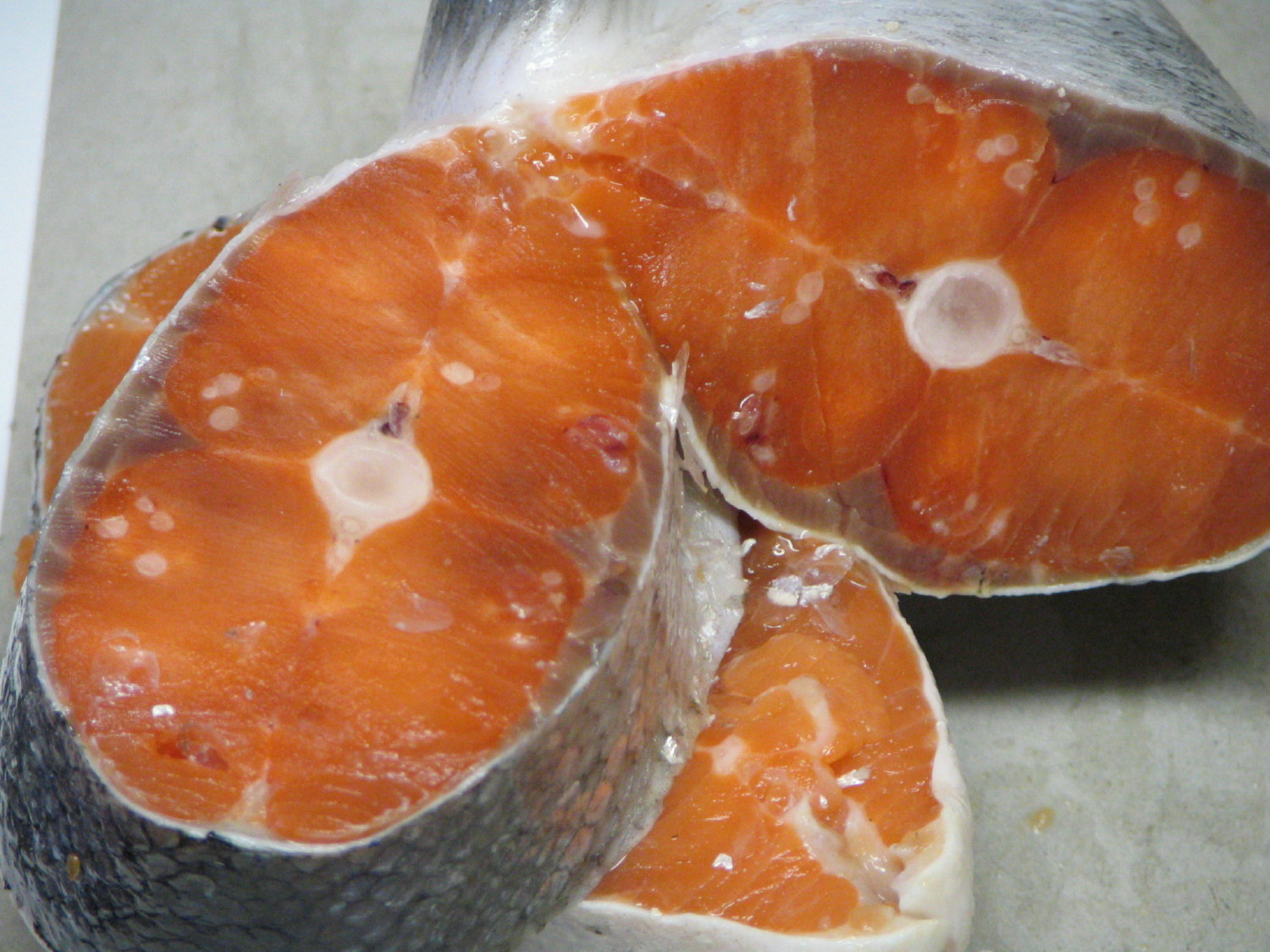
Henneguya salminicola, a protozoan parasite commonly found in the flesh of salmonids on the West Coast of Canada. Coho salmon

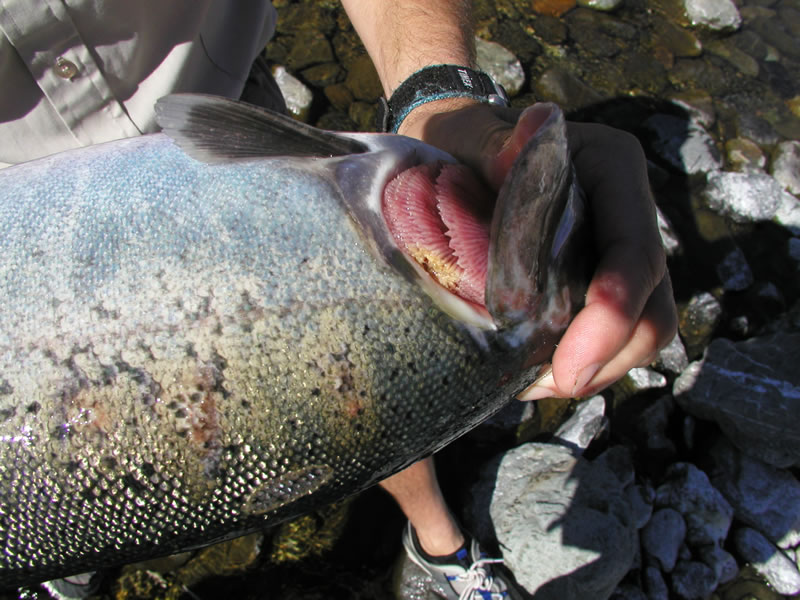
Columnaris in the gill of a chinook salmon

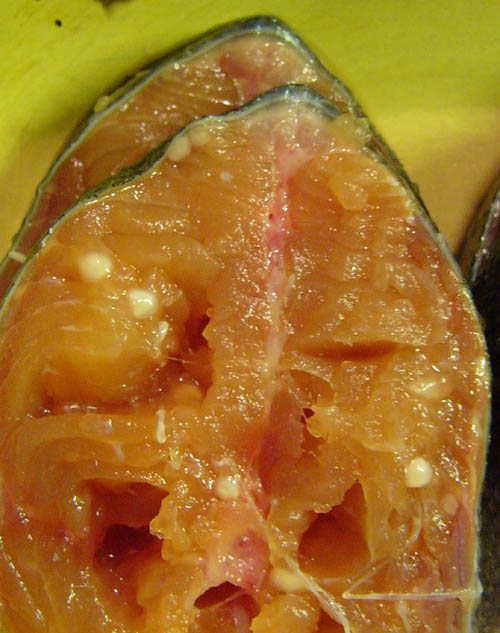
The parasite Henneguya zschokkei in salmon beard

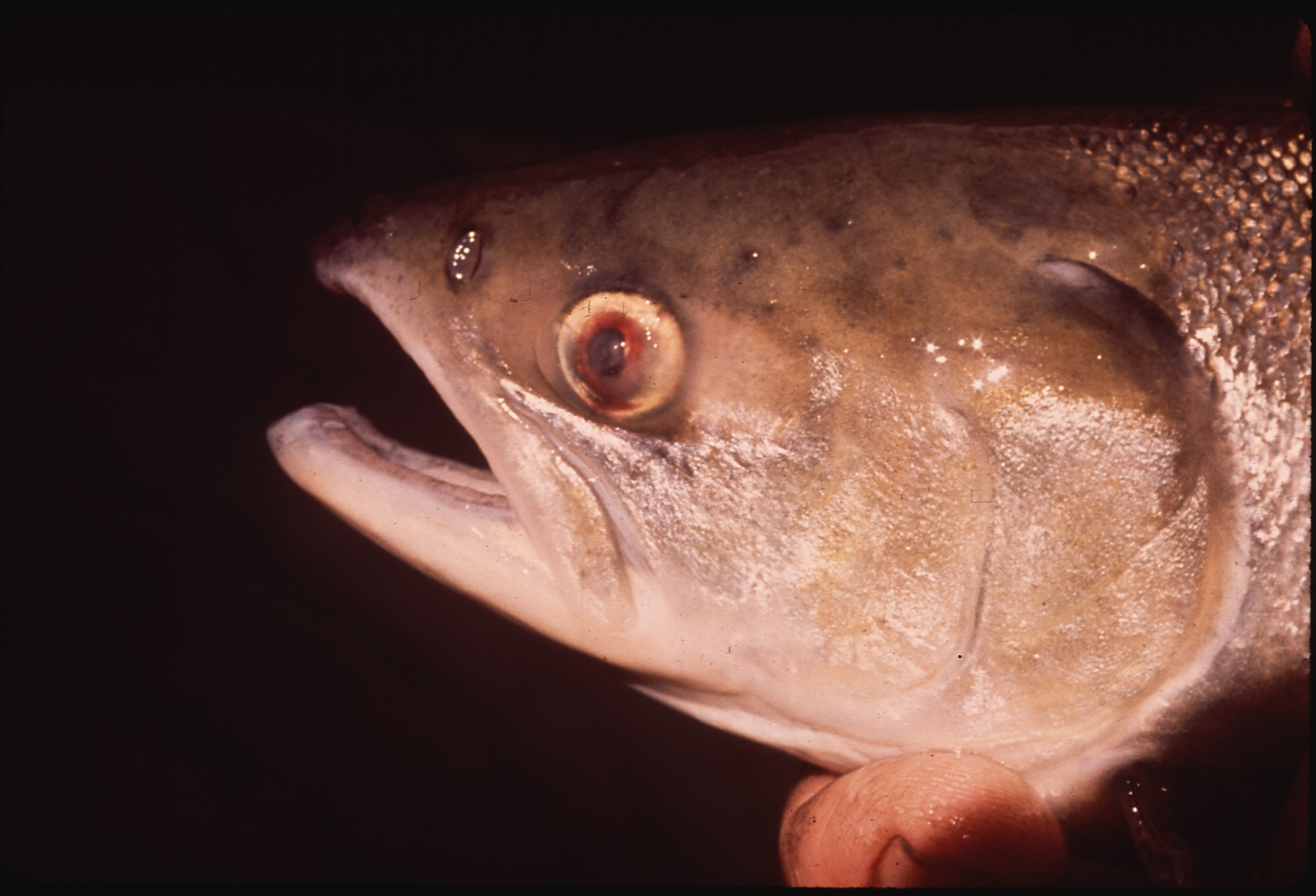
Sockeye salmon with gas bubble disease

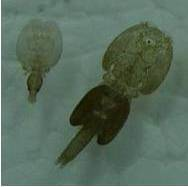
Male and female Lepeophtheirus salmonis
