= Myxobolus braziliensis =

Scientific classification
- Kingdom: Animalia
- Phylum: Cnidaria
- Class: Myxosporea
- Order: Bivalvulida
- Family: Myxobolidae
- Genus: Myxobolus
- Species: M. braziliensis

Binomial name
- Myxobolus braziliensis Casal, Matos & Azevedo, 1996

Catfish pathogen from northern Brazil

Myxobolus braziliensis is a species of myxozoa in the family Myxobolidae. M. braziliensis is a parasitic cnidarian that infects the gills of Bunocephalus coracoideus, found in the Amazon River in the range of Belém, Pará.
