= Myxobolus cuneus =

Scientific classification
- Kingdom: Animalia
- Phylum: Cnidaria
- Class: Myxosporea
- Order: Bivalvulida
- Family: Myxobolidae
- Genus: Myxobolus
- Species: M. cuneus

Binomial name
- Myxobolus cuneus Adriano, Arana & Cordeiro, 2006

Species of cnidarian

Myxobolus cuneus is a species of Myxozoa, a parasitic Cnidarian within the family Myxobolidae, found in Sao Paulo. M. cuneus infests Piaractus mesopotamicus, often being found in the gill bladder, urinary bladder, gills, spleen, fins, head surface, liver, and heart within the fish.
