= Kudoa thyrsites =

Scientific classification
- Kingdom: Animalia
- Phylum: Cnidaria
- Class: Myxosporea
- Order: Multivalvulida
- Family: Kudoidae
- Genus: Kudoa
- Species: K. thyrsites

Binomial name
- Kudoa thyrsites (Gilchrist, 1924)

Species of marine parasite

Kudoa thyrsites is a myxosporean parasite of marine fishes. It has a worldwide distribution, and infects a wide range of host species. This parasite is responsible for causing economic losses to the fisheries sector, by causing post-mortem "myoliquefaction", a softening of the flesh to such an extent that the fish becomes unmarketable. It is not transmissible to humans.

== Taxonomy ==
The spores of K. thyrsites are stellate in shape, with 4 valves and 4 polar capsules. Upon infection by the actinosporean stage the sporoplasm migrates to a muscle fibre where it forms a pseudocyst. Within these pseudocysts are the developing spore stages. Comparison of 18S rDNA sequences of Kudoa species and other myxozoan species to determine their relationships. They show that Kudoa species are distinct from other myxozoans analyzed (Myxidium sp., Myxobolus sp., and Henneguya zschokkei). Kudoa thyrsites is an interesting member of this group in that apparently has very broad host specificity, infecting many fish species around the world (Table 1).

== Pathology ==
Members of the genus Kudoa primarily infect muscle tissue of marine fishes, where they form nodules or pseudocysts containing a great number of individual spores. In lighter infections these pseudocysts are isolated from the fish's immune system within the muscle fibre. More intense infections can result in severe inflammation surrounding infected muscle fibres. Although apparently asymptomatic in all but heavy infections, they are associated with post-mortem degeneration of the tissue. This softening of flesh is most likely a result the release of proteolytic enzymes by the parasite. This causes losses to both aquaculture operations, for instance, where salmon are being reared in "sea-pens", and to capture fisheries. Losses are both direct, through the degradation of fish products, and indirectly, through the perception of the consumer that fish from a particular area are of a lower quality. The intensity of K. thyrsites infection is positively correlated with the severity of flesh softening in Atlantic salmon fillets. Softening of flesh always occurred with heavily infected fillets, while lightly infected fillets showed no softening. Prevention and/or control of K. thyrsites infections is problematic especially in open water netpens. Currently there are no available treatments. One approach to control may be to disrupt the life cycle in some way thereby minimizing the likelihood of infection.

Table 1. Distribution and species infected by Kudoa thyrsites
Location	Species	Common name
North America	Merluccius productus	Pacific hake
	Oncorhynchus spp.	Pacific salmon
	Icelinus filamentosus	Threadfin sculpin
	Ophiodon elongatus	Lingcod
	Aulorhynchus flavidus	Tube-snout
	Salmo salar	Atlantic Salmon
	Reinhardtius stomias	Arrowtooth Flounder
	Eopsetta jordani	Petrale sole
	Hippoglossus stenolepis	Pacific halibut
	Microstomus pacificus	Dover sole
	Lepidopsetta bilineatus	Rock sole
	Platichthys stellatus	Starry flounder
	Parophrys vetula	English sole
	Theragra chalcogramma	Alaskan pollock
	Merluccius capensis	Cape hake
Australia	Engraulis australis	Australian anchovy
	Thunnus maccoyii	Southern Bluefin Tuna
	Engraulis japonicus	Japanese anchovy
	Sardinella lemuru	Bali sardinella
	Sardinops neopilchardus	Australian pilchard
	Spratelloides delicatulus	Blue sprat
	Coryphaena hippurus	Mahi Mahi
South Africa	Sardinops ocellatus	South African pilchard
	Thyrsites atun	Snoek
Chile	Paralichthys adspersus	Fine flounder
Japan	Cypselurus sp.	Flying fish
Ireland	Salmo salar	Atlantic Salmon
	Clupea harengus	Herring
Spain	Salmo salar	Atlantic Salmon
United Kingdom	Scomber scomber	Mackerel
	Salmo trutta	Brown trout

== Life cycle ==
The myxosporeans have been shown to have complex life cycles using more than one host. Usually a fish and an oligochaete or polychaete worm, and in one case a bryozoan. The life cycle of K. thyrsites is poorly understood. It has been hypothesized that K. thyrsites has an indirect life cycle involving some marine invertebrate. Experiments have shown direct transmission of the marine myxosporean Myxidium leei in sea bream. However, direct transmission of K. thyrsites failed when native fish were fed fresh myxospores. If K. thyrsites does have an indirect life cycle, the intermediate host has yet to be identified.
