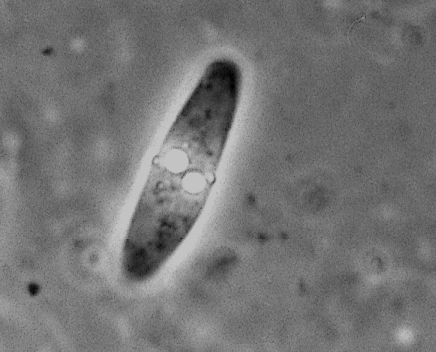
- Actinospore

Scientific classification
- Kingdom: Animalia
- Phylum: Cnidaria
- Class: Myxosporea
- Order: Bivalvulida
- Family: Myxobolidae
- Genus: Myxobolus
- Species: M. spinacurvatura

Binomial name
- Myxobolus spinacurvatura Maeno, Sorimachi, Ogawa & Egusa, 1990

= Myxobolus spinacurvatura =

Species of Myxosporea

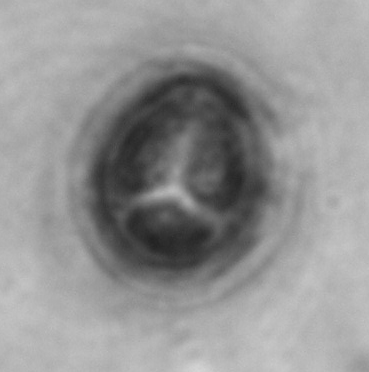
Myxospore

Myxobolus spinacurvatura is a species of Myxozoa in the family Myxobolidae, that inhabits the Mediterranean Sea and the northwestern Pacific Ocean. M. spinacurvatura is a parasitic Cnidarian that infects the Flathead grey mullet, Mugil cephalus. When inside Mugil cephalus, M. spinacurvatura targets mesenteric vessels. M. spinacurvatura also often inhabit a single host alongside multiple other parasitic Myxozoans such as M. bizerti, M. ichkeulensis, and M. episquamalis.
