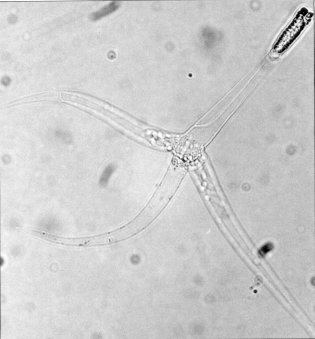
- Actinospore specifically Triactinomyxon stage of Myxobolus cerebralis - note the three "tails"

Scientific classification
- Kingdom: Animalia
- Phylum: Cnidaria
- Class: Myxosporea
- Order: Bivalvulida
- Family: Myxobolidae
- Genus: Myxobolus
- Species: M. cerebralis

Binomial name
- Myxobolus cerebralis Hofer, 1903

Synonyms
- Myxosoma cerebralis Triactinomyxon dubium Triactinomyxon gyrosalmo

= Myxobolus cerebralis =

Species of parasite

Myxobolus cerebralis is a myxosporean parasite of salmonids (salmon and trout species) that causes whirling disease in farmed salmon and trout and also in wild fish populations. It was first described in rainbow trout in Germany in 1893; its range has spread and it has appeared in most of Europe (including Russia), the United States, South Africa, Canada and other countries from shipments of cultured and wild fish. In the 1980s, M. cerebralis was found to require a tubificid oligochaete (a kind of segmented worm) to complete its life cycle. The parasite infects its hosts with its cells after piercing them with polar filaments ejected from nematocyst-like capsules. This infects the cartilage and possibly the nervous tissue of salmonids, causing a potentially lethal infection in which the host develops a black tail, spinal deformities, and possibly more deformities in the anterior part of the fish.

Whirling disease affects juvenile fish (fingerlings and fry) and causes skeletal deformation and neurological damage. Fish "whirl" forward in an awkward, corkscrew-like pattern instead of swimming normally, find feeding difficult, and are more vulnerable to predation. The mortality rate is high for fingerlings, up to 90% of infected populations, and those that do survive are deformed by the parasites residing in their cartilage, bone, and neurological tissue. They act as a reservoir for the parasite, which is released into water following the fish's death. M. cerebralis is one of the most economically important myxozoans in fish, as well as one of the most pathogenic. It was the first myxosporean whose pathology and symptoms were described scientifically. The parasite is not transmissible to humans.

The taxonomy and naming of both M. cerebralis, and of myxozoans in general, have complicated histories. It was originally thought to infect fish brains (hence the specific epithet cerebralis) and nervous systems, though it soon was found to primarily infect cartilage, skeletal tissue, and nervous tissue. Attempts to change the name to Myxobolus chondrophagus, which would more accurately describe the organism, failed because of nomenclature rules. Later, the organisms previously called Triactinomyxon dubium and T. gyrosalmo (class Actinosporea) were found to be, in fact, triactinomyxon stages of M. cerebralis, the life cycle of which was expanded to include the triactinomyxon stage. Similarly, other actinosporeans were folded into the life cycles of various myxosporeans.

== Taxonomy ==
M. cerebralis is one of the 1,350 known myxozoan parasites known to infect fish. Once thought to be a species of Protozoa, taxonomists noticed characteristics that more closely related M. cerebralis to the phylum Cnidaria. These features included cnidocysts, which are tentacles that are used to hold onto and prey upon the host. M. cerebralis has many diverse stages ranging from single cells to relatively large spores, not all of which have been studied in detail. This complex lifecycle involves two different hosts and numerous developmental stages. These stages happen through mitosis, endogeny, plasmotomy, or possibly meiosis. In the first part of its lifecycle, M. cerebralis is attached to its salmonid host externally. They then use their stinging tentacles to infect the host, causing the skeletal tissues and nervous system to become deformed.

Today, the myxozoans, previously thought to be multicellular protozoans, are considered animals by most scientists, though their status has not officially changed. Recent molecular studies suggest they are related to Bilateria or Cnidaria, with Cnidaria being closer morphologically because both groups have extrusive filaments. Bilateria were somewhat closer in some genetic studies, but those were found to have used samples that were contaminated by material from the host organism, and a 2015 study confirms they are cnidarians.

== Morphology ==
M. cerebralis has many diverse stages ranging from single cells to relatively large spores, not all of which have been studied in detail.

=== Triactinomyxon stage ===
The stages that infect fish, called triactinomyxon spores, are made of a single style that is about 150 micrometers (μm) long and three processes or "tails", each about 200 micrometers long. These spores are typically oval shaped, and display asymmetrical symmetry. A sporoplasm packet at the end of the style contains 64 germ cells surrounded by a cellular envelope. There are also three polar capsules, each of which contains a coiled polar filament between 170 and 180 μm long, with about 5–6 coils in each filament. Polar filaments in both this stage and in the myxospore stage (see picture above) rapidly shoot into the body of the host, creating an opening through which the sporoplasm can enter. When it develops this polar filament it is able to attach to its host.

=== Sporoplasm stage ===
Upon contact with fish hosts and firing of the polar capsules, the sporoplasm contained within the central style of the triactinomyxon migrates into the epithelium or gut lining. Firstly, this sporoplasm undergoes mitosis to produce more amoeboid cells, which migrate into deeper tissue layers, to reach the cerebral cartilage.

=== Myxosporean stage ===
Myxospores, which develop from sporogonic cell stages inside fish hosts, are lenticular. They have a diameter of about 10 micrometers and are made of six cells. Two of these cells form polar capsules, two merge to form a binucleate sporoplasm, and two form protective valves. Myxospores are infective to oligochaetes, and are found among the remains of digested fish cartilage. They are often difficult to distinguish from related species because of morphological similarities across genera. Though M. cerebralis is the only myxosporean ever found in salmonid cartilage, other visually similar species may be present in the skin, nervous system, or muscle.

== Life cycle ==
Myxobolus cerebralis has a two-host life cycle involving a salmonid fish and a tubificid oligochaete. So far, the only worm known to be susceptible to M. cerebralis infection is Tubifex tubifex, though what scientists currently call T. tubifex may in fact be more than one species. First, myxospores are ingested by tubificid worms. In the gut lumen of the worm, the spores extrude their polar capsules and attach to the gut epithelium by polar filaments. The shell valves then open along the suture line and the binucleate germ cell penetrates between the intestinal epithelial cells of the worm. This cell multiplies, producing many amoeboid cells by an asexual cell fission process called merogony. As a result of the multiplication process, the intercellular space of the epithelial cells in more than 10 neighbouring worm segments may become infected.

Around 60–90 days postinfection, sexual cell stages of the parasite undergo sporogenesis, and develop into pansporocysts, each of which contains eight triactinomyxon-stage spores. These spores are released from the oligochaete anus into the water. Alternatively, a fish can become infected by eating an infected oligochaete. Infected tubificids can release triactinomyxons for at least a year. The triactinomyxon spores are carried by the water currents, where they can infect a salmonid through the skin. Penetration of the fish by these spores takes only a few seconds. Within five minutes, a sac of germ cells called a sporoplasm has entered the fish epidermis, and within a few hours, the sporoplasm splits into individual cells that will spread through the fish.

Within the fish, both intracellular and extracellular stages reproduce in its cartilage by asexual endogeny, meaning new cells grow from within old cells. The final stage within the fish is the creation of the myxospore, which is formed by sporogony. They are released into the environment when the fish decomposes or is eaten. Some recent research indicates some fish may expel viable myxospores while still alive.

Myxospores are extremely tough: "it was shown that Myxobolus cerebralis spores can tolerate freezing at −20°C for at least 3 months, aging in mud at 13°C for at least 5 months, and passage through the guts of northern pike Esox lucius or mallards Anas platyrhynchos without loss of infectivity" to worms. Triactinomyxons are much shorter-lived, surviving 34 days or less, depending on temperature.

== Pathology ==
M. cerebralis infections have been reported from a wide range of salmonid species: eight species of "Atlantic" salmonids, Salmo; four species of "Pacific" salmonids, Oncorhynchus; four species of char, Salvelinus; the grayling, Thymallus thymallus; and the huchen, Hucho hucho. M. cerebralis causes damage to its fish hosts through attachment of triactinomyxon spores and the migrations of various stages through tissues and along nerves, as well as by digesting cartilage. The fish's tail may darken, but aside from lesions on cartilage, internal organs generally appear healthy. Other symptoms include skeletal deformities and "whirling" behavior (tail-chasing) in young fish, which was thought to have been caused by a loss of equilibrium, but is actually caused by damage to the spinal cord and lower brain stem. Experiments have shown that fish can kill Myxobolus in their skin (possibly using antibodies), but that the fish do not attack the parasites once they have migrated to the central nervous system. This response varies from species to species.

In T. tubifex, the release of triactinomyxon spores from the intestinal wall damages the worm's mucosa; this may happen thousands of times in a single worm, and is believed to impair nutrient absorption. Spores are released from the worm almost exclusively when the temperature is between 10 °C and 15 °C, so fish in warmer or cooler waters are less likely to be infected, and infection rates vary seasonally.

=== Susceptibility ===
Fish size, age, concentration of triactinomyxon spores, and water temperature all affect infection rates in fish, as does the species of the fish in question. The disease has the most impact on fish less than five months old because their skeletons have not ossified. This makes young fish more susceptible to deformities and provides M. cerebralis more cartilage on which to feed. In one study of seven species of many strains, brook trout and rainbow trout (except one strain) were far more heavily affected by M. cerebralis after two hours of exposure than other species were, while bull trout, Chinook salmon, brown trout, and Arctic grayling were least severely affected. While brown trout may harbor the parasite, they typically do not show any symptoms, and this species may have been M. cerebralis' original host. This lack of symptoms in brown trout meant that the parasite was only discovered after nonnative rainbow trouts were introduced in Europe.

=== Diagnosis ===
The normally uniform trout cartilage is scarred with lesions in which M. cerebralis spores develop, weakening and deforming the connective tissues.

Moderate or heavy clinical infection of fish with whirling disease can be presumptively diagnosed on the basis of changes in behavior and appearance about 35 to 80 days after initial infection, though "injury or deficiency in dietary tryptophan and ascorbic acid can evoke similar signs", so conclusive diagnosis may require finding myxospores in the fish's cartilage. In heavy infections, only examining cartilage microscopically may be necessary to find spores. In less severe infections, the most common test involves digestion of the cranial cartilage with the proteases pepsin and trypsin (pepsin-trypsin digest—PTD) before looking for spores. The head and other tissues can be further examined using histopathology to confirm whether the location and morphology of the spores matches what is known for M. cerebralis. Serological identification of spores in tissue sections using an antibody raised against the spores is also possible. Parasite identity can also be confirmed using polymerase chain reaction to amplify the 415 base pair 18S rRNA gene from M. cerebralis. Fish should be screened at the life stage most susceptible to the parasites, with particular focus on fish in aquaculture units.

== Impact ==
Although originally a mild pathogen of Salmo trutta in central Europe and other salmonids in northeast Asia, the introduction of the rainbow trout (Oncorhynchus mykiss) has greatly increased the impact of this parasite. Having no innate immunity to M. cerebralis, rainbow trout are particularly susceptible, and can release so many spores that even more resistant species in the same area, such as S. trutta, can become overloaded with parasites and incur 80–90% mortalities. Where M. cerebralis has become well-established, it has caused decline or even elimination of whole cohorts of fish.

=== Impact in Europe ===
The impact of M. cerebralis in Europe is somewhat lessened because the species is endemic to this region, giving native fish stocks a degree of immunity. Rainbow trout, the most susceptible species to this parasite, are not native to Europe; successfully reproducing feral populations are rare, so few wild rainbow trout are young enough to be susceptible to infection. On the other hand, they are widely reared for restocking sport-fishing waters and for aquaculture, where this parasite has its greatest impact. Hatching and rearing methods designed to prevent infection of rainbow trout fry have proved successful in Europe. These techniques include hatching eggs in spore-free water and rearing fry to the "ossification" stage in tanks or raceways. These methods give particular attention to the quality of water sources to guard against spore introduction during water exchanges. Fry are moved to earthen ponds only once they are considered to be clinically resistant to the parasite, after skeletal ossification occurs. However, some Norwegian facilities have gotten outbreaks of M. cerebralis causing millions of dollars in loss.

=== Impact in New Zealand ===
M. cerebralis was first found in New Zealand in 1971. The parasite has only been found in rivers in the South Island, away from the most important aquaculture sites. Additionally, salmonid species commercially aquacultured in New Zealand have low susceptibility to whirling disease, and the parasite has also not been shown to affect native salmonids. An important indirect effect of the parasites presence is quarantine restriction placed on exports of salmon products to Australia.

=== Impact in the United States ===
M. cerebralis has been reported in nearly two dozen (green) states in the United States, according to the Whirling Disease Initiative M. cerebralis was first recorded in North America in 1956 in Pennsylvania, having been introduced via infected trout imported from Europe, and has spread steadily south and westwards. Until the 1990s, whirling disease was considered a manageable problem affecting rainbow trout in hatcheries. However, it has recently become established in natural waters of the Rocky Mountain states (Colorado, Wyoming, Utah, Montana, Idaho, New Mexico), where it is causing heavy mortalities in several sportfishing rivers. Some streams in the western United States have lost 90% of their trout. In addition, whirling disease threatens recreational fishing, which is important for the tourism industry, a key component of the economies of some U.S. western states. For example, "the Montana Whirling Disease Task Force estimated trout fishing generated US$300,000,000 in recreational expenditures in Montana alone". Making matters worse, some of the fish species that M. cerebralis infects (bull trout, cutthroat trout, and steelhead) are already threatened or endangered, and the parasite could worsen their already precarious situations. For reasons that are poorly understood, but probably have to do with environmental conditions, the impact on infected fish has been greatest in Colorado and Montana, and least in California, Michigan, and New York.

=== Impact in Canada ===
Whirling disease was first confirmed in fish in Johnson Lake in Banff National Park in August 2016. CFIA Labs confirmed in August and Parks Canada announced the outbreak August 23, 2016. Although it was first discovered in Banff, it is not necessarily where the disease originated and spread. The Government of Alberta is currently sampling and testing fish in 6 different watersheds (Peace River, Athabasca, North Saskatchewan, Red Deer, Bow and Oldman) to see where the disease has spread. Initial sample fish were collected in 2016, and are currently being processed by the Government of Alberta and CFIA labs. Since testing began, it has been detected in the Upper Bow River, and in May 2017 it was confirmed that whirling disease had also been detected in the Oldman River Basin. The declaration does not mean that every susceptible finfish population within the Bow and Oldman River watersheds are infected with the disease.

The parasite was first detected in the adjacent province of British Columbia in January 2024.

As a result of the new declaration, a domestic movement permit will be required from the CFIA for susceptible species and end uses identified in the Domestic Movement Control Program, the vector Tubifex tubifex, the disease causing agent Myxobolus cerebralis, and/or related things out of the infected and buffer areas of Alberta. Recreational and sport fishing, including fishing led by a professional guide, will not require a CFIA permit.

== Prevention and control ==
Some biologists have attempted to disarm triactinomyxon spores by making them fire prematurely. In the laboratory, only extreme acidity or basicity, moderate to high concentrations of salts, or electric current caused premature filament discharge; neurochemicals, cnidarian chemosensitizers, and trout mucus were ineffective, as were anesthetized or dead fish. If spores could be disarmed, they would be unable to infect fish, but further research is needed to find an effective treatment.

Some strains of fish are more resistant than others, even within species; using resistant strains may help reduce the incidence and severity of whirling disease in aquaculture. There is also some circumstantial evidence that fish populations can develop resistance to the disease over time. Additionally, aquaculturists may avoid M. cerebralis infections by not using earthen ponds for raising young fish; this keeps them away from possibly infected tubificids and makes it easier to eliminate spores and oligochaetes through filtration, chlorination, and ultraviolet bombardment. To minimise tubificid populations, techniques include periodic disinfection of the hatchery or aquaculture ponds, and the rearing of small trout indoors in pathogen-free water. Smooth-faced concrete or plastic-lined raceways that are kept clean and free of contaminated water keep aquaculture facilities free of the disease.

Lastly, some drugs, such as furazolidone, furoxone, benomyl, fumagillin, proguanil and clamoxyquine, have been shown to impede spore development, which reduces infection rates. For example, one study showed that feeding fumagillin to O. mykiss reduced the number of infected fish from 73–100% to 10–20%. However, this treatment is considered unsuitable for wild trout populations, and no drug treatment has ever been shown to be effective in the studies required for United States Food and Drug Administration approval.

Recreational and sports fishers can help to prevent the spread of the parasite by not transporting fish from one body of water to another, not disposing of fish bones or entrails in any body of water, and ensuring boots and shoes are clean before moving between different bodies of water. Federal, state, provincial, and local regulations on the use of bait should be followed.

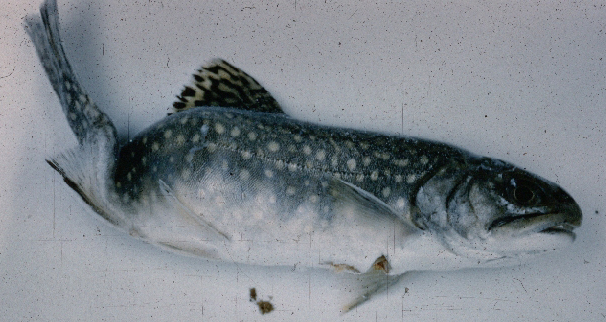
Skeletal deformation in a mature brook trout caused by M. cerebralis infection

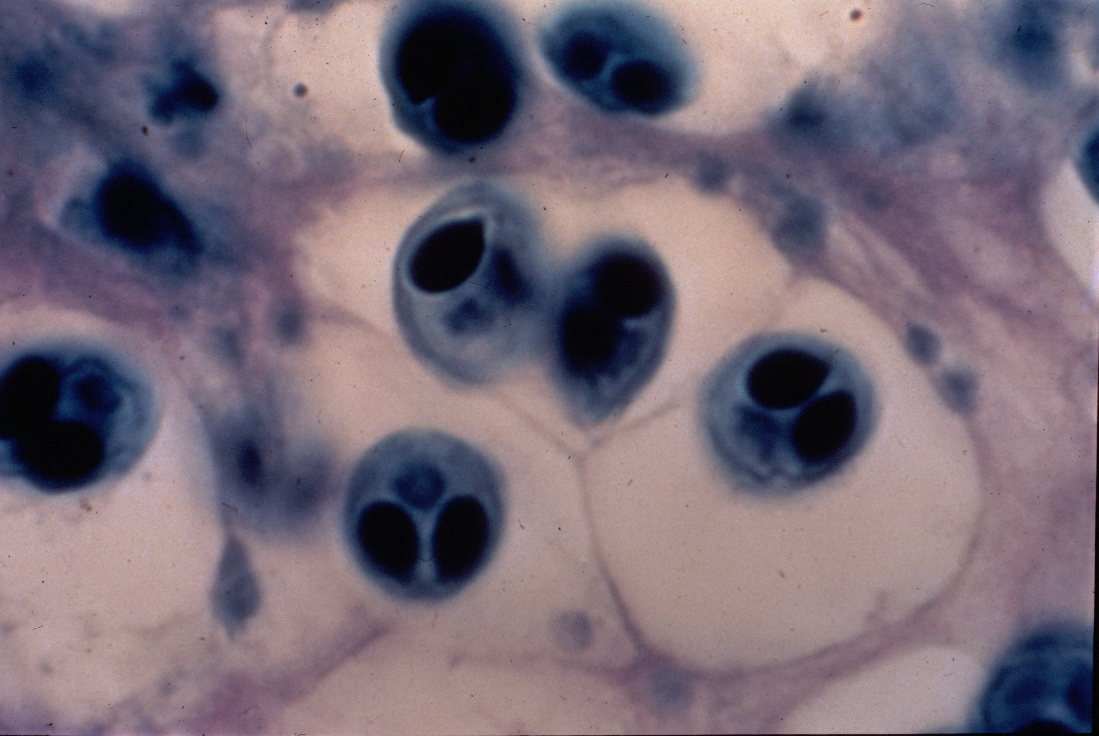
The normally uniform trout cartilage is scarred with lesions in which M. cerebralis spores develop, weakening and deforming the connective tissues.

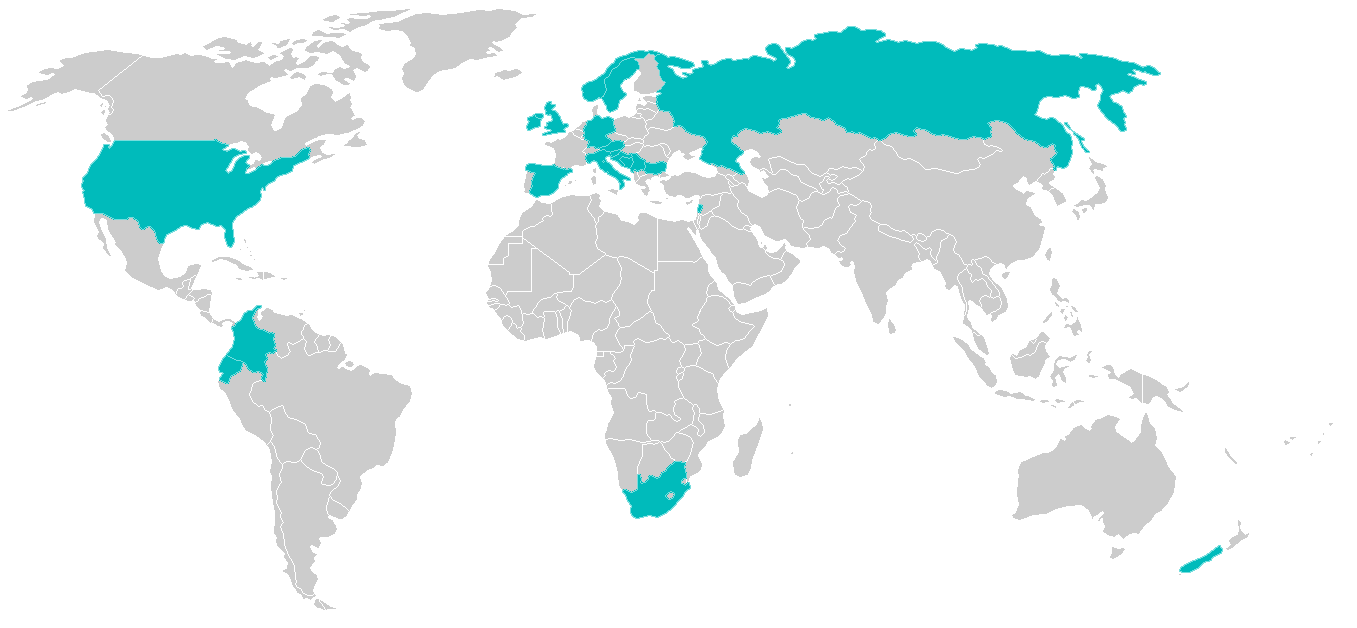
M. cerebralis has been reported in Germany (1893), Italy (1954), Russia (1955), including Sakhalin Island (1960), US (1958), Bulgaria (1960), Former Yugoslavia (1960), Sweden (1966), South Africa (1966), Scotland (1968), New Zealand (1971), Ecuador (1971), Norway (1971), Colombia (1972), Lebanon (1973), Ireland (1974), Spain (1981), England (1981), and Canada (2016).

== See also ==
- Ceratomyxa shasta – another pathogenic myxosporean parasite of salmonids
- Infectious salmon anemia (ISA) – a viral infection of Atlantic salmon
- Kudoa thyrsites – a myxosporean parasite of many species, which causes fish tissues to liquefy on death
- Tetracapsuloides bryosalmonae – the enigmatic myxosporean which causes "proliferative kidney disease" in salmonids
- Salmonid susceptibility to whirling disease
