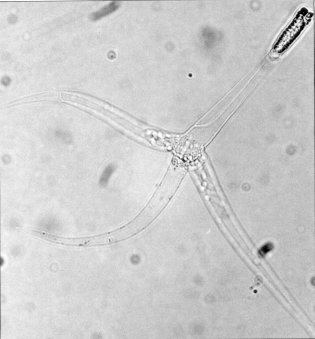
- Triactinomyxon stage of Myxobolus cerebralis

Scientific classification
- Kingdom: Animalia
- Phylum: Cnidaria
- Subphylum: Myxozoa; Grassé, 1970

Subclasses
- Myxosporea; Malacosporea

= Myxozoa =

Subphylum of aquatic parasites

Myxozoa (etymology: Greek: μύξα myxa "slime" or "mucus" + thematic vowel o + ζῷον zoon "animal") is a class of aquatic cnidarian animals – all obligate parasites. It contains the smallest animals ever known to have lived. Over 2,180 species have been described and some estimate they are at least as diverse as the free-living cnidarians, with at least 30,000 undiscovered species. Many have a two-host life cycle, involving a fish and an annelid worm or a bryozoan. The average size of a myxosporean spore usually ranges from 10 μm to 20 μm, whereas that of a malacosporean (a subclade of the Myxozoa) spore can be up to 2 mm. Myxozoans can live in both freshwater and marine habitats.

Myxozoans are highly derived cnidarians that have undergone dramatic evolution from a free swimming, self-sufficient jellyfish-like creature into their current form of obligate parasites composed of very few cells. As myxozoans evolved into microscopic parasites, they lost many genes responsible for multicellular development, coordination, cell–cell communication, and even, in some cases, aerobic respiration. The genomes of some myxozoans are now among the smallest genomes of any known animal species.

== Life cycle and pathology ==
Myxozoans are endoparasitic animals exhibiting complex life cycles that, in most of the documented cases, involve an intermediate host, usually a fish, but in rare cases amphibians, reptiles, birds, and mammals; and a definitive host, usually an annelid or an ectoproct.

Only about 100 life cycles have been resolved and it is suspected that there may be some exclusively terrestrial. The mechanism of infection occurs through valve spores that have many forms, but their main morphology is the same: one or two sporoplasts, which are the real infectious agent, surrounded by a layer of flattened cells called valve cells, which can secrete a layer protective coating and form float appendages. Integrated into the layer of valve cells are two to four specialized capsulogenic cells (in a few cases, one or even 15), each carrying a polar capsule containing coiled polar filaments, an extrudable organelle used for recognition, contact and infiltration. Myxospores are ingested by annelids, in which the polar filaments extrude to anchor the spore to the gut epithelium. Opening of the shell valves allows the sporoplasms to penetrate into the epithelium. Subsequently, the parasite undergoes reproduction and development in the gut tissue, and finally produces usually eight actinosporean spore stages (actinospores) within a pansporocyst. After mature actinospores are released from their hosts they float in the water column. Upon contact with skin or gills of fish, sporoplasms penetrate through the epithelium, followed by development of the myxosporean stage. Myxosporean trophozoites are characterized by cell-in-cell state, where the secondary (daughter) cells develop in the mother (primary) cells. The presporogonic stages multiply, migrate via nervous or circulatory systems, and develop into sporogonic stages. At the final site of infection, they produce mature spores within mono- or di-sporic pseudoplasmodia, or poly-sporic plasmodia.

Relationships between myxosporeans and their hosts are often highly evolved and do not usually result in severe diseases of the natural host. Infection in fish hosts can be extremely long-lasting, potentially persisting for the lifetime of the host. However, an increasing number of myxosporeans have become pathogens with significant impact to the commercial fish industry, largely as a result of aquaculture bringing new species into contact with myxosporeans to which they had not been previously exposed, and to which they are highly susceptible. The economic impact of such parasites can be severe, especially where prevalence rates are high; they may also have a severe impact on wild fish stocks.

The diseases caused by myxosporeas in cultured fish with the most significant economic impact worldwide are proliferative kidney disease (PKD) caused by the malacosporean Tetracapsuloides bryosalmonae, and whirling disease, caused by a myxosporean Myxobolus cerebralis; both diseases affect salmon. Enteromyxosis is caused by Enteromyxum leei in cultured marine sparids, while proliferative gill disease (or "hamburger disease") is caused by Henneguya ictaluri in catfish and S. renicola infections occur in common carp.

== Anatomy ==
Myxozoans are very small animals, typically 10–300 μm in length.

Like other cnidarians they possess cnidocysts, which were referred to as "polar capsules" before the discovery that myxozoans are cnidarians. These cnidocysts fire tubules as in other cnidarians; some inject substances into the host. However, the tubules lack hooks or barbs, and in some species are more elastic than in other cnidarians.

Myxozoans have secondarily lost epithelial structures, a nervous system, gut, and cilia. Members of the subclade Malacosporea retain many ancestral features, such as the presence of true tissues; these are absent in the Myxosporea. Most myxozoans lack muscles, though these are retained in some members of malacosporea. Those who have lost their muscles move around inside the host using other forms of locomotion, such as the use of filopodia, spore valve contractions, amoeboid movements, and rapidly creating and reabsorbing folds on the cell membrane. Other forms of locomotion in the clade involve the use of cytoskeletal elements and vacuoles to produce superficially worm-like movements.

Myxozoans do not undergo embryogenesis during development and have lost true gametes. Instead, they reproduce via multicellular spores. These spores contain the polar capsules, which are not typically present in somatic cells. Centrioles are not involved in the nuclear division of myxozoans. Cell division by binary fission is rare, and cells divide instead via endogeny.

In 2020, the myxozoan Henneguya salminicola was found to lack a mitochondrial genome, and thus be incapable of aerobic respiration. After Spinoloricus cinziae, it was the first animal to be positively identified as such. Its actual metabolism is currently unknown.

== Phylogenetics ==
Myxozoans were originally considered to be protozoans, and were included among other non-motile forms in the group Sporozoa. As their distinct nature became clear through 18S ribosomal DNA (rDNA) sequencing, they were relocated in the metazoa. Detailed classification within the metazoa was however long hindered by conflicting rDNA evidence: although 18S rDNA suggested an affinity with Cnidaria, other rDNA sampled, and the HOX genes of two species, were more similar to those of the Bilateria.

The discovery that Buddenbrockia plumatellae, a worm-like parasite of bryozoans up to 2 mm in length, is a myxozoan initially appeared to strengthen the case for a bilaterian origin, as the body plan is superficially similar. Nevertheless, closer examination reveals that Buddenbrockia's longitudinal symmetry is not twofold, but fourfold, casting doubt on this hypothesis.

Further testing resolved the genetic conundrum by sourcing the first three previously identified discrepant HOX genes (Myx1-3) to the bryozoan Cristatella mucedo and the fourth (Myx4) to northern pike, the respective hosts of the two corresponding Myxozoa samples. This explained the confusion: the original experiments had used samples contaminated by tissue from host organisms, leading to false positives for a position among the Bilateria. More careful cloning of 50 coding genes from Buddenbrockia firmly established the clade as severely modified members of the phylum Cnidaria, with medusozoans as their closest relatives. Similarities between myxozoan polar capsules and cnidarian nematocysts had been drawn for a long time, but were generally assumed to be the result of convergent evolution.

Taxonomists now recognize the outdated subgroup Actinosporea as a life-cycle phase of Myxosporea.

Molecular clocks suggest that myxozoans and their closest relatives, the Polypodiozoa, shared their last common ancestor with medusozoans about 600 million years ago, during the Ediacaran period.

== Taxonomy ==
Myxozoan taxonomy has undergone great and important changes in its levels of generic, family and suborder classification. Fiala et al. (2015) proposed a new classification based on spores.

Phylum: Cnidaria
Subphylum: Myxozoa
Class: Malacosporea	Class: Myxosporea (sequel)
Order: Malacovalvulida	Order: Bivalvulida (sequel)
Family: Saccosporidae	Family: Myxobilatidae
Genus: Buddenbrockia, Tetracapsuloides	Genus: Myxobilatus, Acauda, Hoferellus
Class: Myxosporea	Family: Chloromyxidae
Order: Bivalvulida	Genus: Chloromyxum, Caudomyxum, Agarella
Suborder: Variisporina	Family: Coccomyxidae
Family: Sphaeromyxidae	Genus: Coccomyxa, Auerbachia, Globospora
Genus: Sphaeromyxa	Family: Alatosporidae
Family: Myxidiidae	Genus: Alatospora, Pseudalatospora, Renispora
Genus: Myxidium, Zschokkella, Enteromyxum, Sigmomyxa, Soricimyxum, Cystodiscus	Family: Parvicapsulidae
Family: Ortholineidae	Genus: Parvicapsula, Neoparvicapsula, Gadimyxa
Genus: Ortholinea, Neomyxobolus, Cardimyxobolus, Triangula, Kentmoseria	Suborder: Platysporina
Family: Sinuolineidae	Family: Myxobolidae
Genus: Sinuolinea, Myxodavisia, Myxoproteus, Bipteria, Paramyxoproteus, Neobipteria, Schulmania, Noblea, Latyspora	Genus: Myxobolus, Spirosuturia, Unicauda, Dicauda, Phlogospora, Laterocaudata, Henneguya, Hennegoides, Tetrauronema, Thelohanellus, Neothelohanellus, Neohenneguya, Trigonosporus
Family: Fabesporidae	Order: Multivalvulida
Genus: Fabespora	Family: Trilosporidae
Family: Ceratomyxidae	Genus: Trilospora, Unicapsula
Genus: Ceratomyxa, Meglitschia, Ellipsomyxa, Ceratonova	Family: Kudoidae
Family: Sphaerosporidae	Genus: Kudoa
Genus: Sphaerospora, Wardia, Palliatus	Family: Spinavaculidae
	Genus: Octospina
Incertae sedis in Multivalvulida: Trilosporoides

- Phylum: Cnidaria
  - Class: Myxozoa
    - Subclass: Malacosporea
      - Order:Malacovalvulida
        - Family:Saccosporidae
          Genus: Buddenbrockia, Tetracapsuloides
    - Subclass: Myxosporea
      - Order:Bivalvulida
        - Suborder:Variisporina
          - Family:Sphaeromyxidae
            Genus: Sphaeromyxa
          - Family:Myxidiidae
            Genus:
            Myxidium, Zschokkella, Enteromyxum, Sigmomyxa, Soricimyxum, Cystodiscus
          - Family:Ortholineidae
            Genus:
            Ortholinea, Neomyxobolus, Cardimyxobolus, Triangula, Kentmoseria
          - Family:Sinuolineidae
            Genus:
            Sinuolinea, Myxodavisia, Myxoproteus, Bipteria, Paramyxoproteus, Neobipteria, Schulmania, Noblea, Latyspora
          - Family:Fabesporidae
            Genus: Fabespora
          - Family:Ceratomyxidae
            Genus:
            Ceratomyxa, Meglitschia, Ellipsomyxa, Ceratonova
          - Family:Sphaerosporidae
            Genus:
            Sphaerospora, Wardia, Palliatus
          - Family:Myxobilatidae
            Genus:
            Myxobilatus, Acauda, Hoferellus
          - Family:Chloromyxidae
            Genus:
            Chloromyxum, Caudomyxum, Agarella
          - Family:Coccomyxidae
            Genus:
            Coccomyxa, Auerbachia, Globospora
          - Family:Alatosporidae
            Genus:
            Alatospora, Pseudalatospora, Renispora
          - Family:Parvicapsulidae
            Genus:
            Parvicapsula, Neoparvicapsula, Gadimyxa
        - Suborder:Platysporina
          - Family:Myxobolidae
            Genus:
            Myxobolus, Spirosuturia, Unicauda, Dicauda, Phlogospora, Laterocaudata, Henneguya, Hennegoides, Tetrauronema, Thelohanellus, Neothelohanellus, Neohenneguya, Trigonosporus
      - Order:Multivalvulida
        - Family:Trilosporidae
          Genus: Trilospora, Unicapsula
        - Family:Kudoidae
          Genus: Kudoa
        - Family:Spinavaculidae
          Genus: Octospina
        - incertae sedis: Trilosporoides
  - other Cnidarians
    . . .

== See also ==
- Smallest organisms
