= Gadimyxa =

Scientific classification
- Kingdom: Animalia
- Phylum: Cnidaria
- Class: Myxosporea
- Order: Bivalvulida
- Family: Parvicapsulidae
- Genus: Gadimyxa; Køie, Karlsbakk & Nylund, 2007

Genus of marine parasites

Gadimyxa is a genus of myxozoanns parasites from the family Parvicapsulidae.

== Species ==
The World Register of Marine Species includes the following species in the genus:

- Gadimyxa arctica Køie, Karlsbakk & Nylund, 2007
- Gadimyxa atlantica Køie, Karlsbakk & Nylund, 2007
- Gladimyxa ovale Yurakhno, 2011
- Gadimyxa sphaerica Køie, Karlsbakk & Nylund, 2007
