= Thelohanellus =

Scientific classification
- Kingdom: Animalia
- Phylum: Cnidaria
- Class: Myxosporea
- Order: Bivalvulida
- Family: Myxobolidae
- Genus: Thelohanellus; Kudo, 1933

Genus of marine parasites

Thelohanellus is a genus of myxozoan in the family Myxobolidae.

== Species ==
- Thelohanellus arii Kpatcha, Diebakate, Faye & Toguebaye, 1995
- Thelohanellus pyriformis (Thelohan, 1892)
- Thelohanellus kitauei Egusa & Nakajima, 1981
