= Hennegoides =

Scientific classification
- Kingdom: Animalia
- Phylum: Cnidaria
- Class: Myxozoa
- Order: Bivalvulida
- Family: Myxobolidae
- Genus: Hennegoides; Lom, Tonguthai & Dyková, 1991

Species
- Hennegoides berlandi Molnár, Székely, Mohamed & Shaharom-Harrison, 2006; Hennegoides flockae Leis, Rosser, Baumgartner & Griffin, 2019; Hennegoides longitudinalis Lom, Tonguthai & Dyková, 1991 (type); Hennegoides malayensis Molnár, Székely, Mohamed & Shaharom-Harrison, 2006; Hennegoides marcquenskiae Leis, Rosser, Baumgartner & Griffin, 2019; Hennegoides pangasii Molnár, Székely, Mohamed & Shaharom-Harrison, 2006

Genus of freshwater fish parasite

Hennegoides is a genus of cnidarian that is part of the family Myxobolidae.
