= Clamoxyquine =

Chemical compound

Clinical data
- ATC code: none

Identifiers
- IUPAC name: 5-Chloro-7-({[3-(diethylamino)propyl]amino}methyl)quinolin-8-ol
- CAS Number: 2545-39-3
- PubChem CID: 18029
- ChemSpider: 17033
- UNII: JUN13FZ6RF
- ChEMBL: ChEMBL2106065
- CompTox Dashboard (EPA): DTXSID50180109

Chemical and physical data
- Formula: C_{17}H_{24}ClN_{3}O
- Molar mass: 321.85 g·mol^{−1}
- 3D model (JSmol): Interactive image
- SMILES: Clc1cc(c(O)c2ncccc12)CNCCCN(CC)CC

Clamoxyquine (INN) or clamoxyquin (former BAN), as the pamoate or hydrochloride salt, is an antiamebic and antidiarrheal drug.

It has been used as a veterinary medicine to treat salmonids for infection with the myxozoan parasite Myxobolus cerebralis.

== Synthesis ==
Antimalarial activity also predominates in a quinoline that bears a diaminoalkyl side chain at a rather different position from the other agents noted.

Clamoxyquin synthesis:

Thus, Mannich condensation of the hydroxyquinoline (1) with formaldehyde and N,N-diethylpropylenediamine affords clamoxyquin (2).
