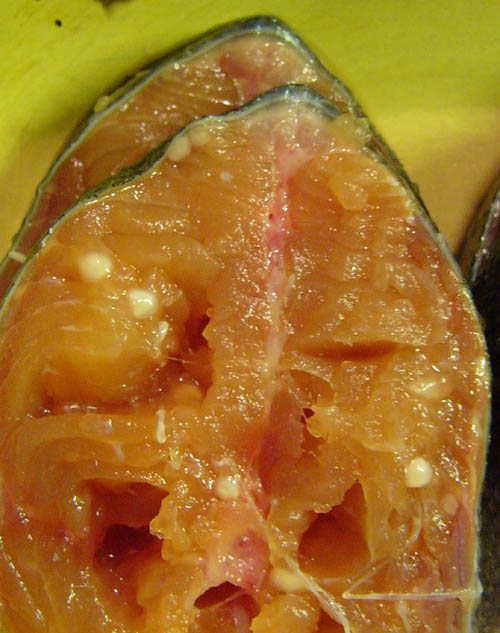
- Henneguya zschokkei in salmon

Scientific classification
- Kingdom: Animalia
- Phylum: Cnidaria
- Class: Myxosporea
- Order: Bivalvulida
- Family: Myxobolidae
- Genus: Henneguya
- Species: H. zschokkei

Binomial name
- Henneguya zschokkei (Gurley, 1894)

Synonyms
- Henneguya salminicola Ward, 1919

= Henneguya zschokkei =

Species of Myxosporea

Henneguya zschokkei or Henneguya salminicola is a species of a myxosporean endoparasite. It afflicts several salmon and trout in the genera Oncorhynchus and Salmo, where it causes milky flesh or tapioca disease. H. zschokkei does not require oxygen to survive and is notable for being one of the very few multicellular organisms in the animal kingdom to rely on an exclusively anaerobic metabolism. It is also notable for its lack of both mitochondria and mitochondrial DNA.

== Description ==
Henneguya zschokkei is found in fish as an ovoid spore with two anterior polar capsules and two long caudal appendages. Individuals are very small (about 10 micrometers in diameter), but are found aggregated into cysts 3–6 mm in diameter at any place in the animal's musculature.

== Life cycle ==
Henneguya zschokkei, a myxozoan, has a complex life cycle involving multiple stages in the intermediate host and the definitive host. Beginning with myxospores, the spores produced by Henneguya zschokkei encyst in the definitive host's muscle tissue.

=== Myxospore stage ===
Myxospores enter the water when infected salmon die. The myxospores are released by the dead salmon during decomposition, exposing living salmon to these myxospores. They attach to the salmon by attaching to skin, fins, and gills of the salmon, penetrating the fish skin, then remains dormant in the salmon's muscle tissue.

=== Intermediate host ===
An intermediate host of the Henneguya zschokkei myxozoan is the oligochaete worm, an annelid worm. These worms consume infected salmon tissue resulting in infection that produces new myxospores, releasing new myxospores in the water which may result in the definitive host, a salmon, being infected. This completes the life cycle of Henneguya zschokkei.

== Metabolism ==
H. zschokkei is incapable of aerobic respiration, making it one of a handful of truly anaerobic animals. It also lacks a mitochondrial genome and therefore mitochondria.

Like all myxozoans, H. zschokkei is ultimately a highly derived cnidarian and is more closely related to jellyfish and sea anemones than those are to corals. However, this obligate internal parasite so little resembles cnidarians (let alone other multicellular animals) that it, along with many other species in the class Myxosporea, were initially categorized as protozoa. It is nevertheless most closely related to jellyfish. This species, like most myxosporeans, lacks many of the diagnostic criteria that identify cnidarians. It is without nervous, epithelial, gut or muscle cells of any kind.

This parasite has not only lost its mitochondria and the mitochondrial DNA residing in them, but also the nuclear genes that code for mitochondrial reproduction. What genetic instructions for these functions that remain lie in useless pseudogenes.

== Origins ==
The origin and cause of H. zschokkei's highly reduced genome are not yet known. While eukaryotes are known for aerobic respiration, a few unicellular lineages native to hypoxic environments have also lost this capacity. In the absence of oxygen, these single-celled organisms lose the portions of their genome that anticipate and govern aerobic respiration. These unusual eukaryotes have developed mitochondria-related organelles (MROs) that fulfill many of the functions of conventional mitochondria. However, there is no evidence of such an adaptation in the multicellular H. zschokkei.

One hypothesis advanced to explain the highly unusual habit of H. zschokkei and its fellow myxosporeans invokes the cancers of cnidarians. On this explanation, animals such as H. zschokkei were originally cancerous growths in free-swimming jellyfish that escaped their parent organism, thereafter becoming a separate species that parasitized other animals. In this H. zschokkei may resemble other pathological organisms that are essentially cancer cells from a neoplasm that once afflicted individual animals, which have escaped their host to lead independent lives. One example of this etiology and rare form of speciation is Canine transmissible venereal tumor.

== Hosts ==
Known hosts of Henneguya zschokkei include:

- Oncorhynchus gorbuscha (Pink salmon)
- Oncorhynchus keta (Chum salmon)
- Oncorhynchus kisutch (Coho salmon)
- Oncorhynchus nerka (Sockeye salmon)
- Anadromous forms of Oncorhynchus mykiss (Rainbow trout)
- Oncorhynchus tshawytscha (Chinook salmon)
- Salmo salar (Atlantic salmon)

== In humans ==
Although the cysts in the flesh are unsightly when present in large numbers, there are no human health concerns associated with Henneguya zschokkei. There have been reports of spores being confused with human spermatozoa in stool samples, indicating that they pass through the body. In at least one example of this misidentification, spores of H. zschokkei found in the stool sample of a 1 year-old child were sufficiently similar to human spermatozoa to initiate a misguided child welfare investigation on the presumption of sexual abuse.

== See also ==
Taxa

- Cryptosporidium parvum, a protist (Apicomplexa) without genes in its mitochondria
- Mastigamoeba, an anaerobic protist (Amoebozoa) without mitochondria
- Monocercomonoides, a protist (Metamonad) without mitochondria
- Loricifera, other metazoans; some species do not require oxygen and may also lack mitochondria
- hydrogenosome, an organelle of some anaerobic taxa

Transmissible cancers

- Canine transmissible venereal tumor
- Devil facial tumor disease
- Contagious reticulum cell sarcoma
