= Neoparvicapsula =

Scientific classification
- Kingdom: Animalia
- Phylum: Cnidaria
- Class: Myxosporea
- Order: Bivalvulida
- Family: Parvicapsulidae
- Genus: Neoparvicapsula; Gayevskaya, Kovaljova, & Schulman, 1982

Genus of myxozoan parasites

Parvicapsula is a genus of myxosporean parasites from the order Bivalvulida.

== Species ==
The World Register of Marine species currently recognizes the following species:

- Neoparvicapsula monolata Sarkar, 1999
- Neoparvicapsula ovalis Gaevskaya, Kovaljova & Shulman, 1982
