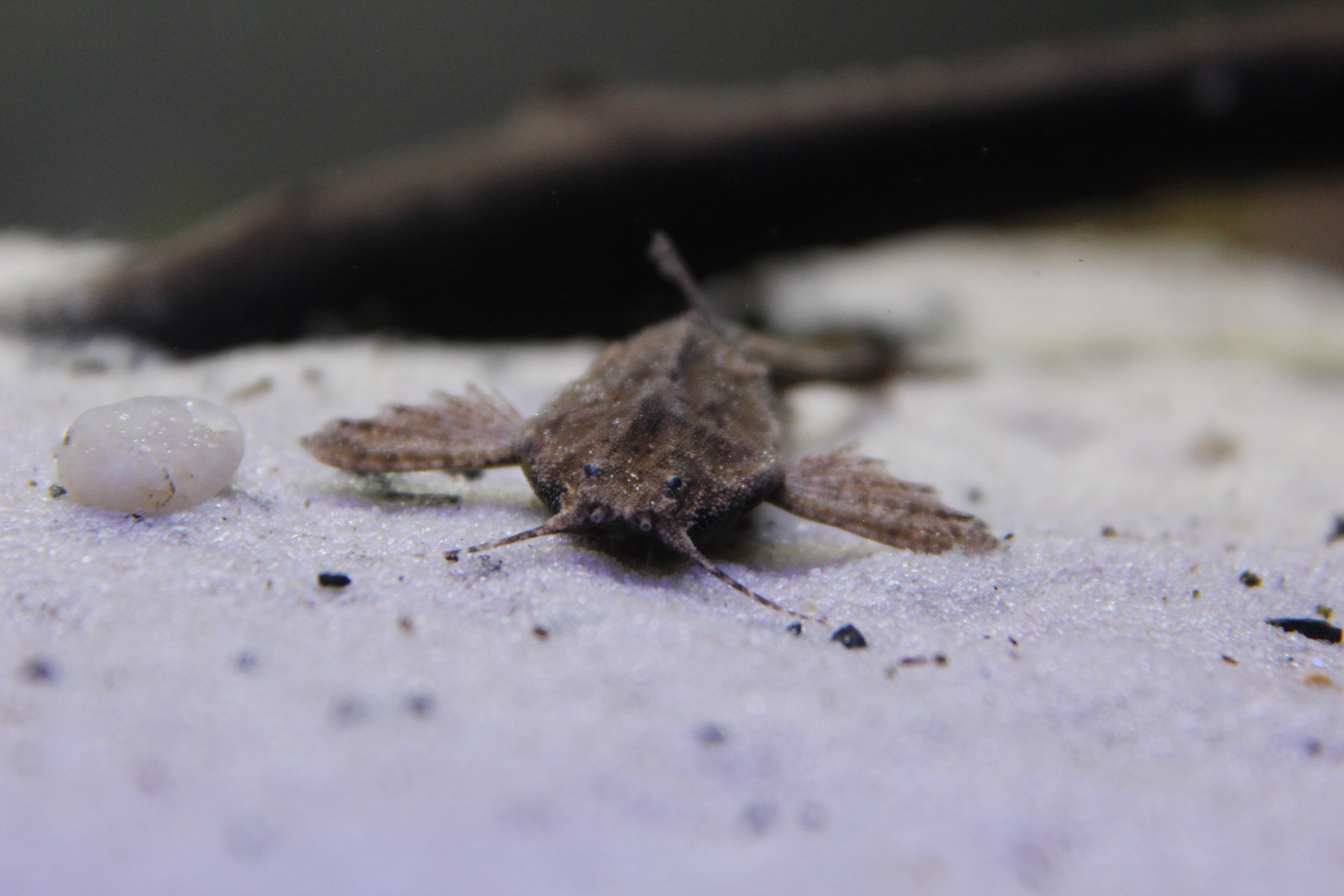

Conservation status
- Least Concern (IUCN 3.1)

Scientific classification
- Kingdom: Animalia
- Phylum: Chordata
- Class: Actinopterygii
- Order: Siluriformes
- Family: Aspredinidae
- Genus: Bunocephalus
- Species: B. coracoideus

Binomial name
- Bunocephalus coracoideus (Cope, 1874)

= Bunocephalus coracoideus =

Species of fish

Bunocephalus coracoideus, the guitarrito, is a species of banjo catfish found in the Amazon River basin. It occurs in Bolivia, Brazil, Peru and Uruguay where it is found in ponds and creeks that contain a large quantity of plant debris. Its diet varies, and may include organic debris from the bottom.

== In the aquarium ==
The species is quite popular in the aquarium trade. Both male and female reach a maximum length of 11 centimeters (4.3 in) SL.

== Behavior ==
This fish is largely nocturnal. It is a bottom-feeder, consuming debris and smaller fish. The guitarrito lays up to 4,000 eggs into sandy substrate.

== Parasites ==
The guitarrito is known to be infected by a single species of myxozoan, Myxobolus braziliensis, which uses the guitarrito as an host.
