= Unicauda =

Scientific classification
- Kingdom: Animalia
- Phylum: Cnidaria
- Class: Myxozoa
- Order: Bivalvulida
- Family: Myxobolidae
- Genus: Unicauda; Davis, 1944

Genus of myxosporean parasites

Unicauda is a genus of cnidarians belonging to the family Myxobolidae.

The species of this genus are found in Southern America.

Species:

- Unicauda basiri Bhatt & Siddiqui, 1964
- Unicauda clavicauda (Kudo, 1934)
- Unicauda crassicauda (Kudo, 1934)
