= Auerbachiidae =

Scientific classification
- Kingdom: Animalia
- Phylum: Cnidaria
- Class: Myxozoa
- Order: Bivalvulida
- Family: Auerbachiidae

Family of cnidarians

Auerbachiidae is a family of cnidarians belonging to the order Bivalvulida.

Genera:

- Auerbachia Meglitsch, 1968
- Globospora Lom, Noble & Laird, 1975
