= Trigonosporus =

Scientific classification
- Kingdom: Animalia
- Phylum: Cnidaria
- Class: Myxosporea
- Order: Bivalvulida
- Family: Myxobolidae
- Genus: Trigonosporus; Hoshina, 1952

Genus of myxosporean parasites

Trigonosporus is a genus of cnidarians belonging to the family Myxobolidae.

Species:

- Trigonosporus acanthogobii Hoshina, 1952
- Trigonosporus zhejiangensis Wu, Jiang & Wang, 1989
