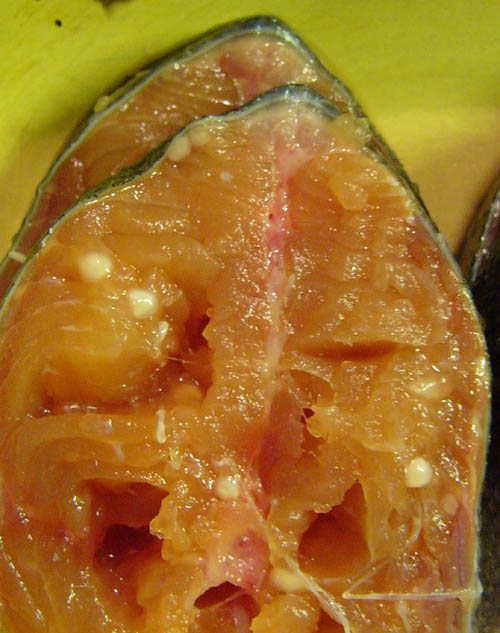
- Henneguya zschokkei

Scientific classification
- Kingdom: Animalia
- Phylum: Cnidaria
- Class: Myxosporea
- Order: Bivalvulida
- Family: Myxobolidae
- Genus: Henneguya; Thélohan, 1892

= Henneguya =

Genus of myxosporean parasites

Henneguya is a genus of myxosporean parasites belonging to the family Myxobolidae.

The species of this genus are found in Europe and America.

The vast majority of Henneguya species are found in freshwater.

== Species ==
Species according to GBIF (except H. adherens):

- Henneguya adherens Azevedo & Matos
- Henneguya adiposa Minchew, 1977
- Henneguya aegea Katharios, Varvarigos, Keklikoglou, Ruetten, Sojan, Akter, Cascarano, Tsertou & Kokkari, 2020
- Henneguya akule Work, Takata, Whipps & Kent, 2008
- Henneguya amazonica Rocha, Matos & Azevedo, 1992
- Henneguya bicornuata Chauduri & Chakravarty, 1970
- Henneguya brachideuteri Kpatcha, Faye, Diebakate, Fall & Toguebaye, 1997
- Henneguya brevis Thélohan, 1892
- Henneguya calcarifera Sarkar, 2010
- Henneguya cardii Severino, Santos & Rocha, 2024
- Henneguya carolina Rocha, Casal, Garcia, Matos, Al-Quraishy & Azevedo, 2014
- Henneguya chaibulaevi Gasimagomedov, 1970
- Henneguya chirodactyli Mayta, Sotil & Chero, 2025
- Henneguya clariae Abolarin, 1971
- Henneguya clini Reed, Basson, Van As & Dykova, 2007
- Henneguya collaris Morsy, Semmler, Al-Olayan & Mehlhorn, 2016
- Henneguya corruscans Eiras, Takemoto & Pavanelli, 2009
- Henneguya creplini (Gurley, 1894)
- Henneguya cynoscioni Dyková, Buron, Roumillat & Fiala, 2011
- Henneguya cystigena Zhang & Yin, 2025
- Henneguya diversis Minchew, 1977
- Henneguya doori Guilford, 1963
- Henneguya friderici Casal, Matos & Azevedo, 2003
- Henneguya garavelli Martins & Onaka, 2006
- Henneguya ictaluri Pote, Hanson, & Shivaji, 2000
- Henneguya joalensis Kpatcha, Faye, Diebakate, Fall & Toguebaye, 1997
- Henneguya jocu Azevedo, Rocha, Matos, Matos, Oliveira, Al-Quraishy & Casal, 2014
- Henneguya kayarensis Kpatcha, Faye, Diebakate, Fall & Toguebaye, 1997
- Henneguya lagodon Hall & Iverson, 1967
- Henneguya lagunensis De Azevedo, Negrelli, De Oliveira, Abdallah, Camara, Matos & Vieira, 2021
- Henneguya lateolabracis Yokoyama, Kawakami, Yasuda & Tanaka, 2003
- Henneguya longicauda Minchew, 1977
- Henneguya lutjani Kpatcha, Faye, Diebakate, Fall & Toguebaye, 1997
- Henneguya maculosus Carriero, Adriano, Silva, Ceccarelli & Maia, 2013
- Henneguya mbourensis Kpatcha, Faye, Diebakate, Fall & Toguebaye, 1997
- Henneguya neapolitana Parisi, 1912
- Henneguya nuesslini Schuberg & Schröder, 1905
- Henneguya nusslini Schuberg & Schröder, 1905
- Henneguya ocellata Iverson & Yokel, 1963
- Henneguya ouakamensis Kpatcha, Faye, Diebakate, Fall & Toguebaye, 1997
- Henneguya pagri Yokoyama, Itoh & Tanaka, 2005
- Henneguya patriciai
- Henneguya pellis Minchew, 1977
- Henneguya postexilis Minchew, 1977
- Henneguya priacanthi Kpatcha, Faye, Diebakate, Fall & Toguebaye, 1997
- Henneguya psorospermica Thélohan, 1892
- Henneguya salminicola Ward, 1919
- Henneguya salvelini Zandt, 1923
- Henneguya sebasta Moser & Love, 1975
- Henneguya shackletoni Brickle, Kalavati & MacKenzie, 2006
- Henneguya shariffi Molnár, Székely, Mohamed & Shaharom-Harrison, 2006
- Henneguya symphodae Lubat, Radujkovic, Marques & Bouix, 1989
- Henneguya unitaeniata Úngari, Vieira, da Silva, Santos, de Azevedo & O'Dwyer, 2019
- Henneguya vitensis Laird, 1950
- Henneguya yoffensis Kpatcha, Faye, Diebakate, Fall & Toguebaye, 1997
- Henneguya zahoori Bhatt & Siddiqui, 1964
- Henneguya zschokkei (Gurley, 1894)
