= Dicauda =

Scientific classification
- Kingdom: Animalia
- Phylum: Cnidaria
- Class: Myxosporea
- Order: Bivalvulida
- Family: Myxobolidae
- Genus: Dicauda; Hoffman & Walker, 1978

Genus of myxosporean parasites

Dicauda is a genus of cnidarians belonging to the family Myxobolidae.

Species:

- Dicauda aatherinodi Hoffman & Walker, 1978
- Dicauda manipurensis Hermanda, Soni & Sharatkumar
