= Auerbachia =

Scientific classification
- Kingdom: Animalia
- Phylum: Cnidaria
- Class: Myxosporea
- Order: Bivalvulida
- Family: Auerbachiidae
- Genus: Auerbachia; Meglitsch, 1960

Genus of cnidarians

Auerbachia is a genus of cnidarians belonging to the family Auerbachiidae. The species of this genus are found in Australia.

There are 11 nominal species within the genus Auerbachia. Most members of genus Auerbachia are coelozoic, inhabiting a cavity of an animal's body, except for the species A. hepatica. Similar to other members of the order Bivalvulida, Auerbachia species have two valves.

List of species:

- Auerbachia anomala Meglitsch, 1968
- Auerbachia caranxi Heiniger, Gunter & Adlard, 2011
- Auerbachia chaetodoni Heiniger, Gunter & Adlard, 2011
- Auerbachia chakravartyi Narasimhamurti, Kalavati, Anuradha & Padma Dorothy, 1990
- Auerbachia chorinemusi Padma Dorothy, Kalavati & Vaidchi, 1998
- Auerbachia hepatica Sarkar, 2006
- Auerbachia monstrosa Meglitsch, 1968
- Auerbachia pulchra Lom, Noble & Laird, 1975
- Auerbachia scomberoidi Heiniger, Gunter & Adlard, 2011
