= Laterocaudata =

Scientific classification
- Kingdom: Animalia
- Phylum: Cnidaria
- Class: Myxosporea
- Order: Bivalvulida
- Family: Myxobolidae
- Genus: Laterocaudata; Chen & Hsieh, 1984

Genus of myxosporean parasites

Laterocaudata is a genus of cnidarians belonging to the family Myxobolidae.

Species:

- Laterocaudata mastacembela Chen & Hsieh, 1984
