= Parvicapsula =

Scientific classification
- Kingdom: Animalia
- Phylum: Cnidaria
- Class: Myxosporea
- Order: Bivalvulida
- Family: Parvicapsulidae
- Genus: Parvicapsula; Shulman, 1953

Genus of myxozoan parasites

Parvicapsula is a genus of myxosporean parasites from the order Bivalvulida. Parvicapsula species infect fish, and several are known to cause severe disease in wild and farmed salmonids.

== Species ==
The World Register of Marine Species recognizes the following species in the genus:

- Parvicapsula anisocaudata Zhao, Ma & Song, 2000
- Parvicapsula asymmetrica Shulman, 1953
- Parvicapsula bicornis Køie, Karlsbakk & Nylund, 2007
- Parvicapsula curvatura Shin, Jin, Sohn & Lee, 2018
- Parvicapsula irregularis (Kabata, 1962)
- Parvicapsula kareii Zhao, Ma & Song, 2000
- Parvicapsula limandae Køie, Karlsbakk & Nylund, 2007
- Parvicapsula minibicornis Kent, Whitaker & Dawe, 1997
- Parvicapsula petuniae Kodádková, Dyková, Tyml, Ditrich & Fiala, 2014
- Parvicapsula pseudobranchicola Karlsbakk, Saether, Hostlund, Fjellsoy & Nylund, 2002
- Parvicapsula renalis Landsberg, 1993
- Parvicapsula schulmani Kovaljova & Gaevskaya, 1981
- Parvicapsula spinachiae Køie, 2003
- Parvicapsula unicornis Kabata, 1962
