= Polar filament =

Parasite organelle

The term polar filament may refer to either of two analogous structures used for host invasion by different groups of parasites: Myxozoa (Metazoa) and Microsporidia (Fungi), respectively.

== In Myxozoa ==
The polar filament is a structure found in the polar capsule of myxosporean organisms. It is homologous to the "penetrant" structure found in cnidocytes.

The polar filament is coiled along the inner wall of the polar capsule, and is capable of rapid extrusion, during which it everts "inside-out". When everted, it is sticky, and likely serves to hold the spore onto the intestinal wall of the prospective host, and to help separate the valves of the spore.

The polar filament is important in species classification. In some species of Ceratomyxa, the polar filament forms a straight basal section, which the rest of the filament coils around, while in the genus Sphaeromyxa, the filament is folded in a zig-zag arrangement rather than being coiled.
