= Chloromyxum =

Scientific classification
- Kingdom: Animalia
- Phylum: Cnidaria
- Class: Myxosporea
- Order: Bivalvulida
- Family: Chloromyxidae
- Genus: Chloromyxum; Mingazzini, 1890

Genus of aquatic animals

Chloromyxum is a genus of parasitic, myxosporean cnidarians belonging to the family Chloromyxidae.

The species of this genus are found in Northern America and Australia.

Species:

- Chloromyxum argusi Chandran, Zacharia, Sathianandan, Shamal, Binesh, Kaur & Sanil, 2018
- Chloromyxum atlantoraji Cantatore, Irigoitia, Holzer, Bartošová-Sojková, Pecková, Fiala & Timi, 2018
- Chloromyxum caudatum Thélohan, 1895
- Chloromyxum hemiscyllii Gleeson & Adlard, 2012
- Chloromyxum kotorensis Lubat, Radujkovic, Marques & Bouix, 1989
- Chloromyxum kuhlii Gleeson & Adlard, 2012
- Chloromyxum kurusi Sanders, Jaramillo, Ashford, Feist, Lafferty & Kent, 2015
- Chloromyxum lesteri Gleeson & Adlard, 2012
- Chloromyxum levigatum Jameson, 1931
- Chloromyxum menticirrhi Casal, Garcia, Matos, Monteiro, Matos & Azevedo, 2009
- Chloromyxum mingazzinii Gleeson & Adlard, 2012
- Chloromyxum myliobati Gleeson & Adlard, 2012
- Chloromyxum opladeli Meglitsch, 1942
- Chloromyxum ornamentum Lisnerová, Martinek, Alama-Bermejo, Bouberlová, Schaeffner, Nkabi, Holzer & Bartošová-Sojková, 2022
- Chloromyxum ovatum Jameson, 1929
- Chloromyxum pristiophori Woolcock, 1936
- Chloromyxum regularis Lisnerová, Martinek, Alama-Bermejo, Bouberlová, Schaeffner, Nkabi, Holzer & Bartošová-Sojková, 2022
- Chloromyxum riorajum Azevedo, Casal, Garcia, Matos, Teles-Grilo & Matos, 2009
- Chloromyxum squali Gleeson & Adlard, 2012
- Chloromyxum sphaericum Fujita, 1927
- Chloromyxum sphyrnae Cunha & Fonseca, 1918
- Chloromyxum thompsomi Meglitsch, 1942
- Chloromyxum trijugum Kudo, 1920
- Chloromyxum trilineatum Sekiya, Rosyadi, Zhang & Sato, 2019
- Chloromyxum tripathii Kalavati & Narasimhamurti, 1984
- Chloromyxum wardi Kudo, 1920
- Chloromyxum zearaji Cantatore, Irigoitia, Holzer, Bartošová-Sojková, Pecková, Fiala & Timi, 2018
