= Sinuolineidae =

Scientific classification
- Kingdom: Animalia
- Phylum: Cnidaria
- Class: Myxosporea
- Order: Bivalvulida
- Family: Sinuolineidae; Shulman, 1959

Genera
- See text

Sinuolineidae is a family of myxosporean parasite from the order Bivalvulida. Many members of the family are parasites of freshwater and marine fish.

== Genera ==
The World Register of Marine Species currently recognizes 10 genera:

- Bipteria Kovaljova, Zubtchenko & Krasin, 1983
- Kentmoseria Lom & Dyková, 1995
- Latyspora Bartošová, Freeman, Yokoyama, Caffara & Fiala, 2011
- Myxodavisia Zhao, Zhou, Kent & Whipps, 2008
- Myxoproteus Doflein, 1898
- Neobipteria Kovaljova, Gajevskaja & Krasin, 1986
- Noblea Kovaljova, 1989
- Paramyxoproteus Wierzbicka, 1986
- Schulmania Kovaljova, Zubchenko & Krasin, 1983
- Sinuolinea Davis, 1917
