= Salmonid susceptibility to whirling disease =

This page tabulates susceptibility of various salmonids to whirling disease.

Susceptibility to whirling disease among salmonids
Genus	Common Name	Score
Oncorhynchus	Rainbow trout	3
Oncorhynchus	Steelhead trout	3
Oncorhynchus	Cutthroat trout	
Oncorhynchus	Yellowstone cutthroat	2
Oncorhynchus	Westslope cutthroat	2
Oncorhynchus	Colorado River cutthroat	2
Oncorhynchus	Rio Grande cutthroat	2
Oncorhynchus	Greenback cutthroat	2
Oncorhynchus	Chinook salmon	2
Oncorhynchus	Sockeye salmon	3
Oncorhynchus	Chum salmon	1 S
Oncorhynchus	Pink salmon	1 S
Oncorhynchus	Cherry salmon	1 S
Oncorhynchus	Coho salmon	1
Salvelinus	Brook trout	2
Salvelinus	Dolly Varden	1 S
Salvelinus	Bull trout	1
Salvelinus	Lake trout	0 S
Salmo	Atlantic salmon	2 S
Salmo	Brown trout	1
Prosopium	Mountain whitefish	2 S
Thymallus	European grayling	2 S
Thymallus	Arctic grayling	0
Hucho	Danube salmon	3

Susceptibility as defined in laboratory or exposure to M. cerebralis at vulnerable life stages. Score of 0-3 or S:

- 0=resistant, no spores develop;
- 1=partial resistance, clinical disease rare and develops only when exposed to very high parasite doses.
- 2=susceptible, clinical disease common at high parasite doses, but greater resistance to disease at low doses.
- 3=highly susceptible, clinical disease common.
- S=susceptibility is unclear (conflicting reports, insufficient data, lack of M. cerebralis confirmation).

Data collated by Beth MacConnell and Dick Vincent and used with permission of the Whirling Disease Initiative, which funded the study.
