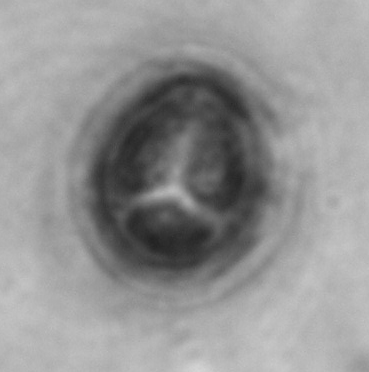
- Myxobolus spinacurvatura

Scientific classification
- Kingdom: Animalia
- Phylum: Cnidaria
- Class: Myxosporea
- Order: Bivalvulida
- Family: Myxobolidae
- Genus: Myxobolus; Bütschli, 1882

Species
- See text

Synonyms
- Myxosoma Theolan, 1892; Lentospora Plehn, 1905; Facieplatycaudata Wyatt, 1979

= Myxobolus =

Genus of marine parasites

Myxobolus is a genus of myxozoa that includes important parasites of fish like Myxobolus cerebralis. The genus is polyphyletic, with members scattered throughout the myxozoa. Some stages of Myxobolus species were previously thought to be different organisms entirely, but are now united in this group. Some fish species, such as the thicklip grey mullet, can harbour a dozen Myxobolus species.

One of the smallest species (Myxobolus szekeli) is no more than 8.5 μm (0.0085 mm) when fully grown, making it the smallest known animal.

== Species ==
Source: World Register of Marine Species

- Myxobolus acanthogobii Hoshina, 1952
- Myxobolus acanthopagri Lom & Dyková, 1994
- Myxobolus achmerovi Shulman, 1966
- Myxobolus acutus (Fujita, 1912)
- Myxobolus adeli Yurakhno & Ovcharenko, 2014
- Myxobolus aeglefini Auerbach, 1906
- Myxobolus aisanensis Chen in Chen & Ma, 1998
- Myxobolus aldrichetti Su & White, 1994
- Myxobolus algonquinensis Xiao & Desser, 1997
- Myxobolus aligarhensis Bhatt & Siddiqui, 1964
- Myxobolus anatolicus Pekmezci, Yardimci, Yilmaz & Polat, 2014
- Myxobolus arabicus Kardousha & El-Tantawy, 2002
- Myxobolus asymmetricus (Parisi, 1912)
- Myxobolus aureatus Ward, 1919
- Myxobolus balantiocheili Levsen, Alvik & Grotmol, 2004
- Myxobolus bartoni Kalavati, Brickle & MacKenzie, 2000
- Myxobolus baskai Molnár, Székely, Mohamed & Shaharom-Harrison, 2006
- Myxobolus bilineatum Bond, 1938
- Myxobolus bizerti Bahri & Marques, 1996
- Myxobolus branchialis (Markewitsch, 1932)
- Myxobolus braziliensis Casal, Matos & Azevedo, 1996
- Myxobolus cephalus Iverson, Chitty & Van Meter, 1971
- Myxobolus chengkiangensis Ma, 1998
- Myxobolus cheni Shulman, 1962
- Myxobolus chiungchowensis Chen in Chen & Ma, 1998
- Myxobolus conei Lom & Dyková, 1994
- Myxobolus cultus Yokoyama, Ogawa & Wakabayashi, 1995
- Myxobolus cuneus Adriano, Arana & Cordeiro, 2006
- Myxobolus cyprinicola Reuss, 1906
- Myxobolus diagrammae Kpatcha, Diebakate, Faye & Toguebaye, 1995
- Myxobolus diaphanus Fantham, Porter & Richardson, 1940
- Myxobolus episquamalis Egusa, Maeno & Sorimachi, 1990
- Myxobolus etropli Rajendran, Vijayan & Alavandi, 1998
- Myxobolus exiguus Thélohan, 1895
- Myxobolus ganguli Sarkar, Haldar & Chakraborti, 1982
- Myxobolus gayerae Molnar, Marton, Eszterbauer & Szekely, 2007
- Myxobolus ginbuna Kato, Kasai, Tomochi, Li & Sato, 2017
- Myxobolus girellae Lom & Dyková, 1994
- Myxobolus gobii Naidenova, 1975
- Myxobolus goensis Eiras & D'Souza, 2004
- Myxobolus goreensis Fall, Kpatcha, Diebakate, Faye & Toguebaye, 1997
- Myxobolus grandiintercapsularis Shulman, 1962
- Myxobolus hani Faye, Kpatcha, Diebakate, Fall & Toguebaye, 1999
- Myxobolus hannensis Fall, Kpatcha, Diebakate, Faye & Toguebaye, 1997
- Myxobolus hudsonis (Bond, 1938)
- Myxobolus hypseleotris Chen in Chen & Ma, 1998
- Myxobolus ichkeulensis Bahri & Marques, 1996
- Myxobolus improvisus Izyumova in Shulman, 1966
- Myxobolus inflatus Chen in Chen & Ma, 1998
- Myxobolus insidiosus Wyatt & Pratt, 1963
- Myxobolus klamathellus Atkinson & Banner, 2016
- Myxobolus lalithakumarii Gunter & Adlard, 2010
- Myxobolus latipinnacola Wold & Iversen, 1978
- Myxobolus lintoni Gurley, 1893
- Myxobolus longi Eiras, Molnar & Lu, 2005
- Myxobolus macropodusi (Chen in Chen & Ma, 1998)
- Myxobolus mahendrae Sarkar, 1986
- Myxobolus merlucii (Perugia, 1891)
- Myxobolus mexicanus Yoshino & Noble, 1973
- Myxobolus monopterus (Chen in Chen & Ma, 1998)
- Myxobolus muelleri Bütschli, 1882
- Myxobolus mugauratus Landsberg & Lom, 1991
- Myxobolus mugcephalus (Narasimhamurti, 1980)
- Myxobolus mugchelo Landsberg & Lom, 1991
- Myxobolus mugilis (Perugia, 1891)
- Myxobolus mystusius Sarkar, 1986
- Myxobolus narasii (Narasimhamurti, 1970)
- Myxobolus neurophilus (Guilford, 1963)
- Myxobolus nile Eiras, Molnar & Lu, 2005
- Myxobolus ophicephali Bhatt & Siddiqui, 1964
- Myxobolus pangasii Molnár, Székely, Mohamed & Shaharom-Harrison, 2006
- Myxobolus paratoyamai Kato, Kasai, Tomochi, Li & Sato, 2017
- Myxobolus parenzani Landsberg & Lom, 1991
- Myxobolus parvus Shulman, 1962
- Myxobolus percae Fantham, Porter & Richardson, 1939
- Myxobolus perforata Ali, Al-Rasheid, Sakran, Abdel-Baki & Abdel-Ghaffar, 2002
- Myxobolus petenensis Frey, Cone & Duobinis-Gray, 1998
- Myxobolus petruschewskii Zhukov, 1964
- Myxobolus pleuronectidae Hahn, 1917
- Myxobolus purkynjei Lom & Dyková, 1994
- Myxobolus raibauti Fall, Kpatcha, Diebakate, Faye & Toguebaye, 1997
- Myxobolus rhinogobii Chen in Chen & Ma, 1998
- Myxobolus rhodei Lom & Dyková, 1994
- Myxobolus saranai (Tripathi, 1953)
- Myxobolus saugati Kaur & Singh, 2011
- Myxobolus scleroperca (Guilford, 1963)
- Myxobolus spinacurvatura Maeno, Sorimachi, Ogawa & Egusa, 1990
- Myxobolus spirosulcatus Maeno, Sorimachi, Ogawa & Kearn, 1995
- Myxobolus stomum Ali, Abdel-Baki, Sakran, Entzeroth & Abdel-Ghaffar, 2003
- Myxobolus subtecalis (Bond, 1938)
- Myxobolus szekeli Kaur & Singh, 2011
- Myxobolus tanakai Kato, Kasai, Tomochi, Li & Sato, 2017
- Myxobolus tapajosi Zatti, Atkinson, Maia, Correa, Bartholomew & Adriano, 2018
- Myxobolus tripterygii (Laird, 1953)
- Myxobolus vanivilasae Seenappa & Manohar, 1980
