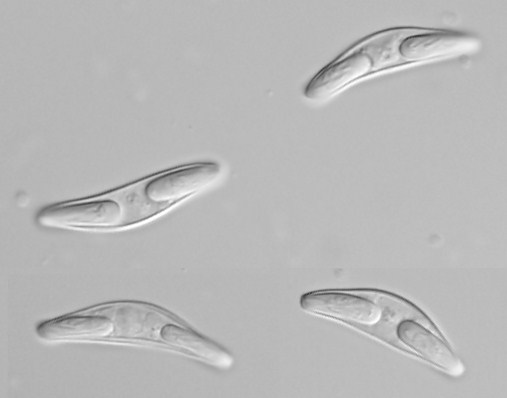
- Sphaeromyxa hellandi

Scientific classification
- Kingdom: Animalia
- Phylum: Cnidaria
- Class: Myxosporea
- Order: Bivalvulida
- Family: Sphaeromyxidae
- Genus: Sphaeromyxa; Thélohan, 1892

= Sphaeromyxa =

Genus of cnidarians

Sphaeromyxa is a genus of cnidarians belonging to the family Sphaeromyxidae.

The species of this genus are found in Europe and Northern America.

== Species ==
Species:

- Sphaeromyxa arcuata Fantham, 1930
- Sphaeromyxa argentinensis Timi & Sardella, 1998
- Sphaeromyxa artedielli Karlsbakk, Einen & Bartosova, 2013
- Sphaeromyxa atherinae Karataev & Iskov, 1984
- Sphaeromyxa balbianii Thélohan, 1892
- Sphaeromyxa bengalensis Sarkar, 2010
- Sphaeromyxa bonaerensis Timi & Sardella, 1998
- Sphaeromyxa cannolii Sears, Anderson & Greiner, 2011
- Sphaeromyxa chacundae Sarkar, 2004
- Sphaeromyxa clini Bartošová-Sojková, Kodádková, Pecková, Kuchta & Reed, 2015
- Sphaeromyxa cornuti Surendran, Vijayagopal & Sanil, 2022
- Sphaeromyxa cottidarum Dogiel, 1948
- Sphaeromyxa curvala Fantham, 1930
- Sphaeromyxa diacanthusa Sarkar, 2004
- Sphaeromyxa dighae Sarkar & Majumder, 1983
- Sphaeromyxa elegini Dogiel, 1948
- Sphaeromyxa exneri Awerinzew, 1913
- Sphaeromyxa ganapatii Kalavati & Vaidehi, 1991
- Sphaeromyxa gasterostei Georgévitch, 1916
- Sphaeromyxa gibbonsia Noble, 1939
- Sphaeromyxa hareni Sarkar, 1984
- Sphaeromyxa hellandi Auerbach, 1909
- Sphaeromyxa hexagrammi Dogiel, 1948
- Sphaeromyxa horrida Miller, Barnett, Seymour, Jenkins, McNamara & Adlard, 2018
- Sphaeromyxa incurvata Doflein, 1898
- Sphaeromyxa intermediata Moser & Noble, 1977
- Sphaeromyxa japonica Aseeva, 2002
- Sphaeromyxa kenti Whipps & Font, 2013
- Sphaeromyxa lateralis Noble, 1941
- Sphaeromyxa limocapitis Bartošová-Sojková, Kodádková, Pecková, Kuchta & Reed, 2015
- Sphaeromyxa lomi Moser & Noble, 1977
- Sphaeromyxa longa Dunkerley, 1920
- Sphaeromyxa lycodi Kristmundsson & Freeman, 2013
- Sphaeromyxa magna Zhukov, 1964
- Sphaeromyxa maiyai Morrison & Pratt, 1973
- Sphaeromyxa minuta Polyanskii, 1955
- Sphaeromyxa nesogobii Su & White, 1994
- Sphaeromyxa noblei Lom, 2004
- Sphaeromyxa opisthopterae Sarkar, 1999
- Sphaeromyxa ovata Dunkerley, 1920
- Sphaeromyxa ovula Noble, 1939
- Sphaeromyxa parva Dogiel, 1948
- Sphaeromyxa photopectoralis Chen, Yang, Whipps, Peng & Zhao, 2020
- Sphaeromyxa pultai Tripathi, 1953
- Sphaeromyxa reinhardti Jameson, 1929
- Sphaeromyxa sabrazesi Laveran & Mesnil, 1900
- Sphaeromyxa schulmani Kovaljova & Gaevskaya, 1982
- Sphaeromyxa scorpaena Qing, Chen, Li, Yang & Zhao, 2020
- Sphaeromyxa sebastisca Chen, Yang, Whipps, Peng & Zhao, 2020
- Sphaeromyxa sevastopoli Naidenova, 1970
- Sphaeromyxa solomoni Aseeva, 2002
- Sphaeromyxa theraponi Tripathi, 1953
- Sphaeromyxa tripterygii Laird, 1953
- Sphaeromyxa tuanfengensis Hsieh & Gong, 1993
- Sphaeromyxa xiamenensis Chen, Yang, Whipps, Peng & Zhao, 2020
- Sphaeromyxa zaharoni Diamant, Whipps & Kent, 2004
