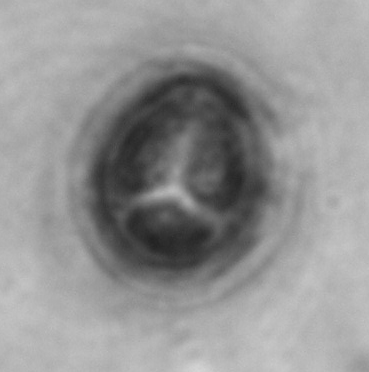
- Myxobolus spinacurvatura, a species of Myxobolidae (Myxobolus)

Scientific classification
- Kingdom: Animalia
- Phylum: Cnidaria
- Class: Myxosporea
- Order: Bivalvulida
- Suborder: Platysporina; Kudo, 1919
- Family: Myxobolidae; Thélohan, 1892

= Myxobolidae =

Family of marine parasites

Myxobolidae is a family of myxosporean parasites which typically infect freshwater fishes, and includes the economically significant species, Myxobolus cerebralis. They have been shown to have a complex life cycle, involving an alternate stage in an invertebrate, typically an annelid or polychaete worm.

== Morphology ==
Myxosporean spores of genera belonging to the Myxobolidae are flattened parallel to the sutural line. They typically contain two polar capsules, and have a central vacuole in which they store β-glycogen. In some genera, the spore walls are drawn out into long processes which are thought to slow sinking through the water column.

Actinosporean stages which have been linked to members of the Myxobolidae have a single central "style" and three processes or "tails", around 200 micrometers long, projecting from this. A sporoplasm packet at the end of the style contains 64 germ cells surrounded by a cellular envelope. There are also three polar capsules, each of which contains a coiled polar filament.

== Genera ==
- Dicauda Hoffman & Walker, 1978
- Hennegoides Lom, Tonguthai & Dyková, 1991
- Henneguya Thélohan, 1892
- Laterocaudata Chen & Hsieh, 1984
- Myxobolus Bütschli, 1882
- Thelohanellus Kudo, 1933
- Trigonosporus Hoshina, 1952
- Unicauda Davis, 1944
