= Ortholinea =

Scientific classification
- Kingdom: Animalia
- Phylum: Cnidaria
- Class: Myxozoa
- Order: Bivalvulida
- Family: Ortholineidae
- Genus: Ortholinea; Shulman, 1962

Genus of cnidarians

Ortholinea is a genus of cnidarians belonging to the family Ortholineidae.

The species of this genus are found in Europe and Northern America.

Species:

- Ortholinea divergens (Thélohan, 1895)
- Ortholinea fluviatilis Lom & Dykova, 1995
- Ortholinea gobiusi Naidenova, 1968
- Ortholinea macrouri Kovaljova, Velev & Vladev, 1993
- Ortholinea orientalis (Shulman & Shulman-Albova, 1953)
- Ortholinea sakinachanumae Ibragimov, 1988
