= Parvicapsulidae =

Scientific classification
- Kingdom: Animalia
- Phylum: Cnidaria
- Class: Myxosporea
- Order: Bivalvulida
- Suborder: Variisporina
- Family: Parvicapsulidae; Shulman, 1953

Genera
- See text

Family of marine parasites

Parvicapsulidae is a family of myxosporeanns parasites from the order Bivalvulida.

== Genera ==
- Gadimyxa Køie, Karlsbakk & Nylund, 2007
- Neoparvicapsula Gayevskaya, Kovaljova & Schulman, 1982
- Parvicapsula Shulman, 1953
