= Sporoplasm =

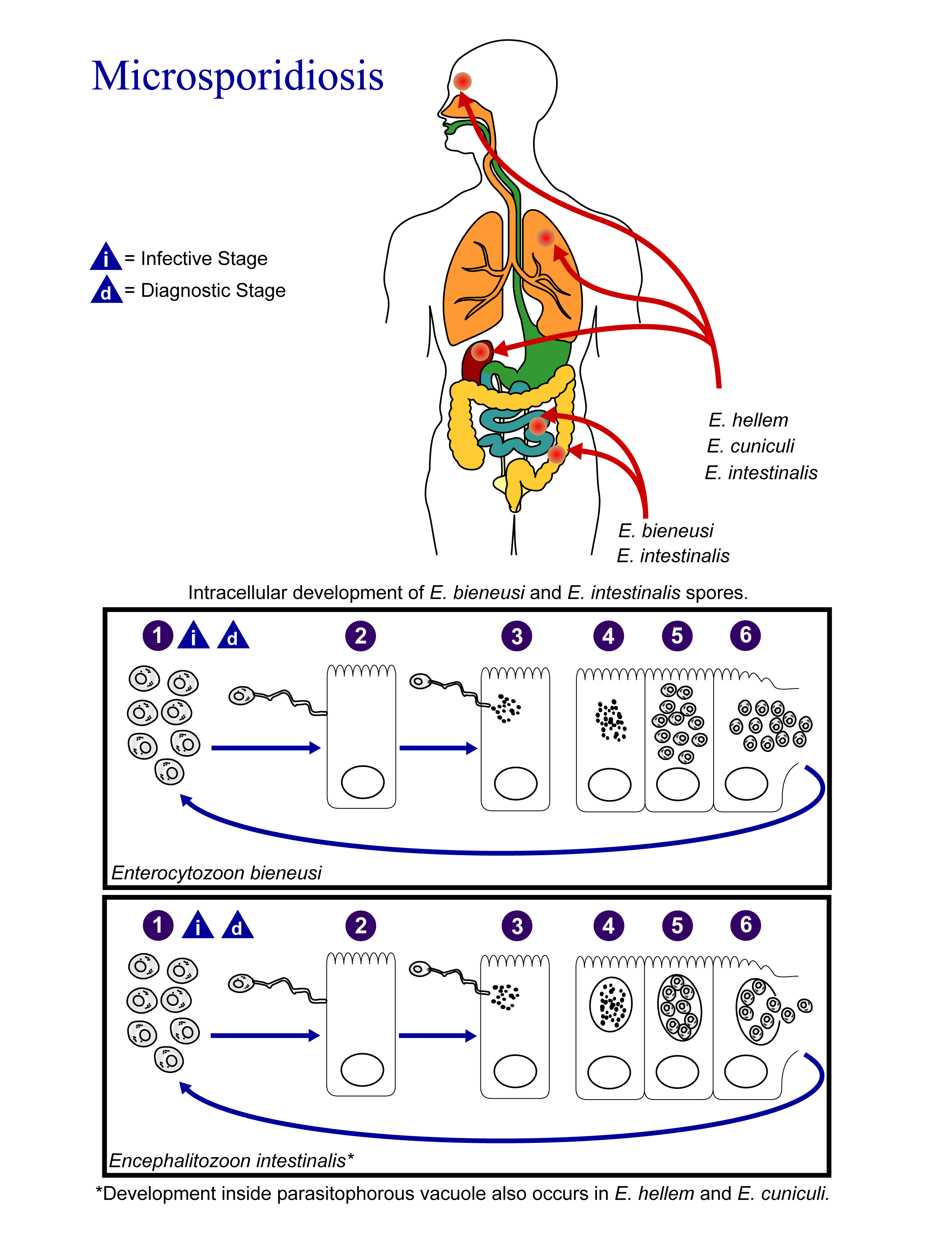
Figure showing process by which a sporoplasm is injected into host cells via polar tube (stage 3).

Sporoplasm is an infectious material present in the cytoplasm of various fungi-like organisms, such as members of class Microsporidia. Sporoplasm is defined as a mass of protoplasm that gives rise to or forms a spore. The protoplasmic body that is released as an infective amoebula from a cnidosporidian cyst.

== Mode of infection ==
It is injected to host cell through a coiled polar tube which acts as a spring-like tubular extrusion mechanism. It is mainly involved in the asexual cycle of the organism.

== Reproduction ==
Inside the host cell, the sporoplasm multiplies to generate meronts, cells with loosely organized organelles enclosed in a simple plasma membrane. Multiplication occurs either by merogony (binary fission) or schizogony (multiple fission) or plasmotomy (division of nucleus without relation to cytoplasm to produce multi-nucleated offspring).
