= Polar capsule =

Structure of a Myxosporea parasite

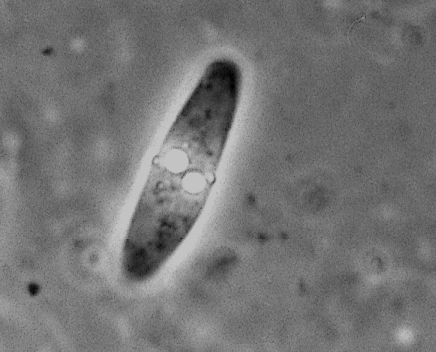
Alataspora solomoni, a myxosporean parasite of Atlantic horse mackerel, showing the arrangement of the polar capsules on either side of the sutural line.

Polar capsules are structures found in the valves of myxosporean parasites, which contain the polar filament. The polar capsule is constructed of a proteinaceous and a polysaccharide layer, both layers of which continue into the polar filament.

The mouth of the capsule is covered with a cap-like structure. This structure may function as a stopper, its digestion in the alimentary tract possibly triggering the discharge of the polar filaments.

Two ideas have been proposed to explain the eversion of the polar filaments. Firstly, that the hydrostatic pressure in the polar capsule pushes the filament out, rather like the cnidocyst of jellyfish. The second is that extrusion is an active process involving contractile proteins and is calcium-dependent (Uspenskaya, 1982).
