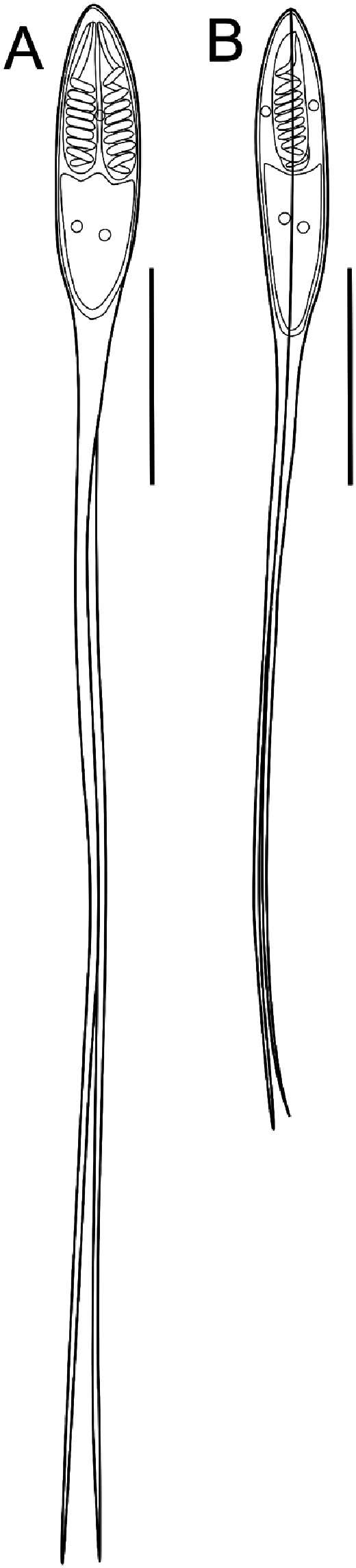
- Henneguya postexilis

Scientific classification
- Kingdom: Animalia
- Phylum: Cnidaria
- Class: Myxosporea
- Order: Bivalvulida; Shulman, 1959

Suborders
- Platysporina; Sphaeromyxina; Variisporina

= Bivalvulida =

Order of marine parasites

Bivalvulida is an order of myxosporean parasites which contains a number of species which cause economically significant losses to aquaculture and fisheries, such as Myxobolus cerebralis and Ceratomyxa shasta. The Myxosporean stages of members of the bivalvulida are characterised by their two spore valves (hence the name), which meet in a "suture line" which encircles the spore. They usually contain two polar capsules, but species have been reported which contain either one or four.

== Taxonomy and systematics ==
The order Bivalvulida is composed of three suborders and thirteen families.

- Suborder Platysporina Kudo, 1919
  - Myxobolidae Thélohan, 1892
  - Tetrauronematidae Wu, Wang & Zhang, 1988
- Suborder Sphaeromyxina Lom & Noble, 1984
  - Sphaeromyxidae Lom & Noble, 1984
- Suborder Variisporina Lom & Noble, 1984
  - Auerbachiidae
  - Alatasporidae Shulman, Kovaleva & Dubina, 1979
  - Ceratomyxidae Doflein, 1899
  - Chloromyxidae Thélohan, 1892
  - Coccomyxidae Léger & Hesse, 1907
  - Enteromyxidae Freeman, Yanagida, & Kristmundsson, 2020
  - Fabesporidae Naidenova & Zaika, 1969
  - Gadimyxidae Yurakhno, 2011
  - Gastromyxidae Freeman & Kristmundsson, 2015
  - Monomyxidae Freeman & Kristmundsson, 2015
  - Myxidiidae Thélohan, 1892
  - Myxobilatidae Shulman, 1953
  - Ortholineidae Lom & Noble, 1984
  - Parvicapsulidae Shulman, 1953
  - Sinuolineidae Shulman, 1959
  - Sphaerosporidae Davis, 1917

== Gallery ==
Drawings and scanning electron microscopy of species of Chloromyxum

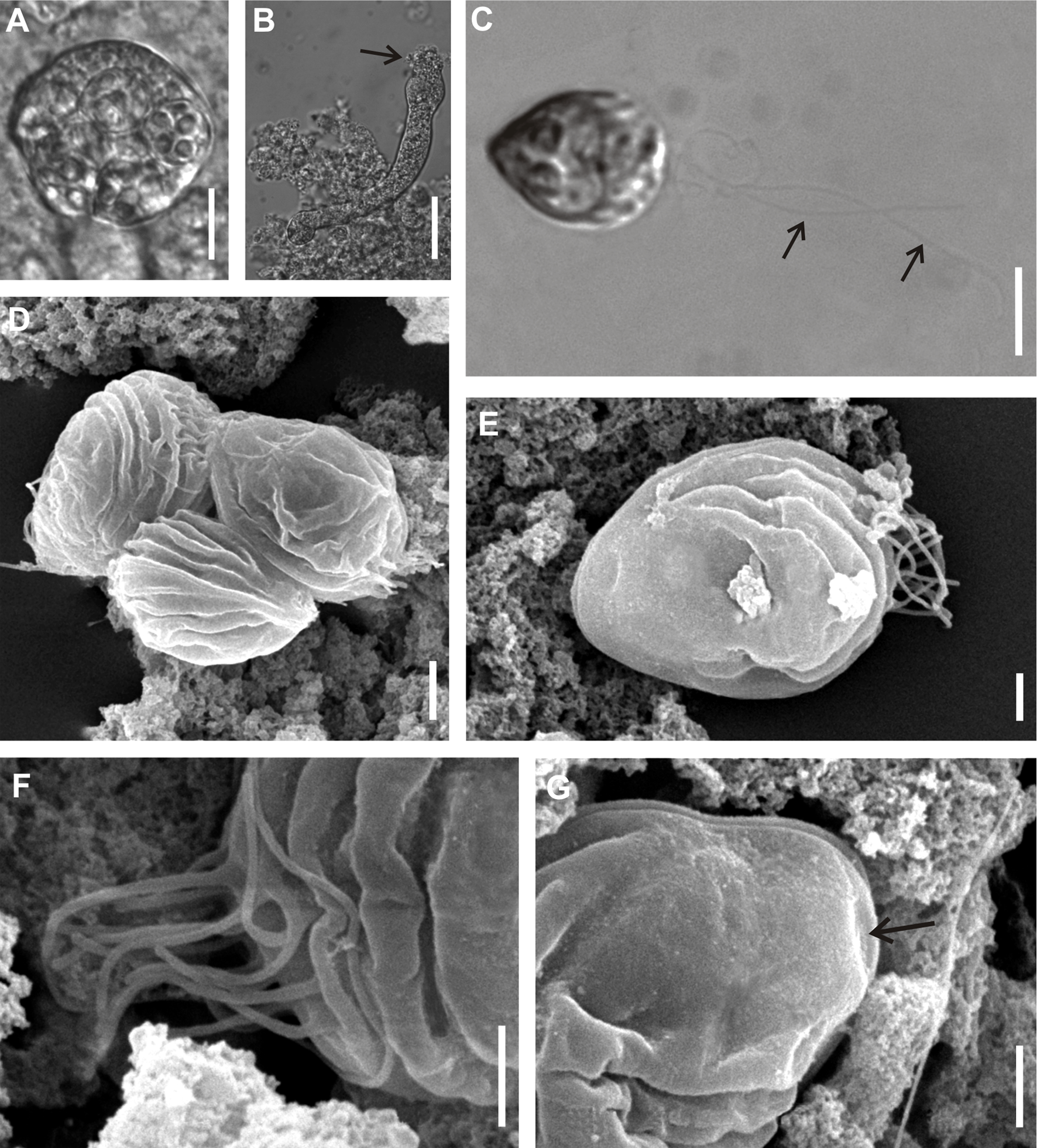
Chloromyxum atlantoraji

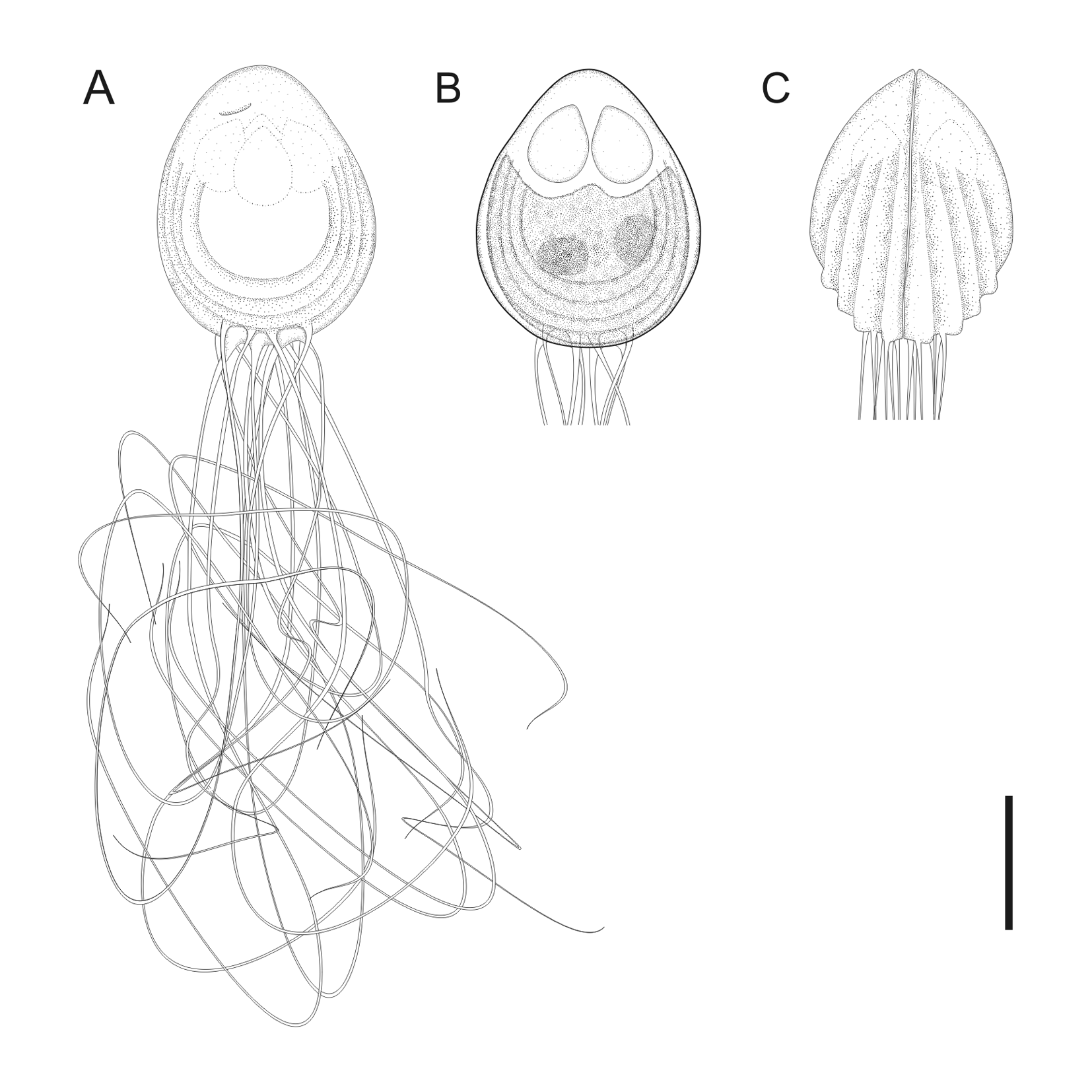
Chloromyxum atlantoraji

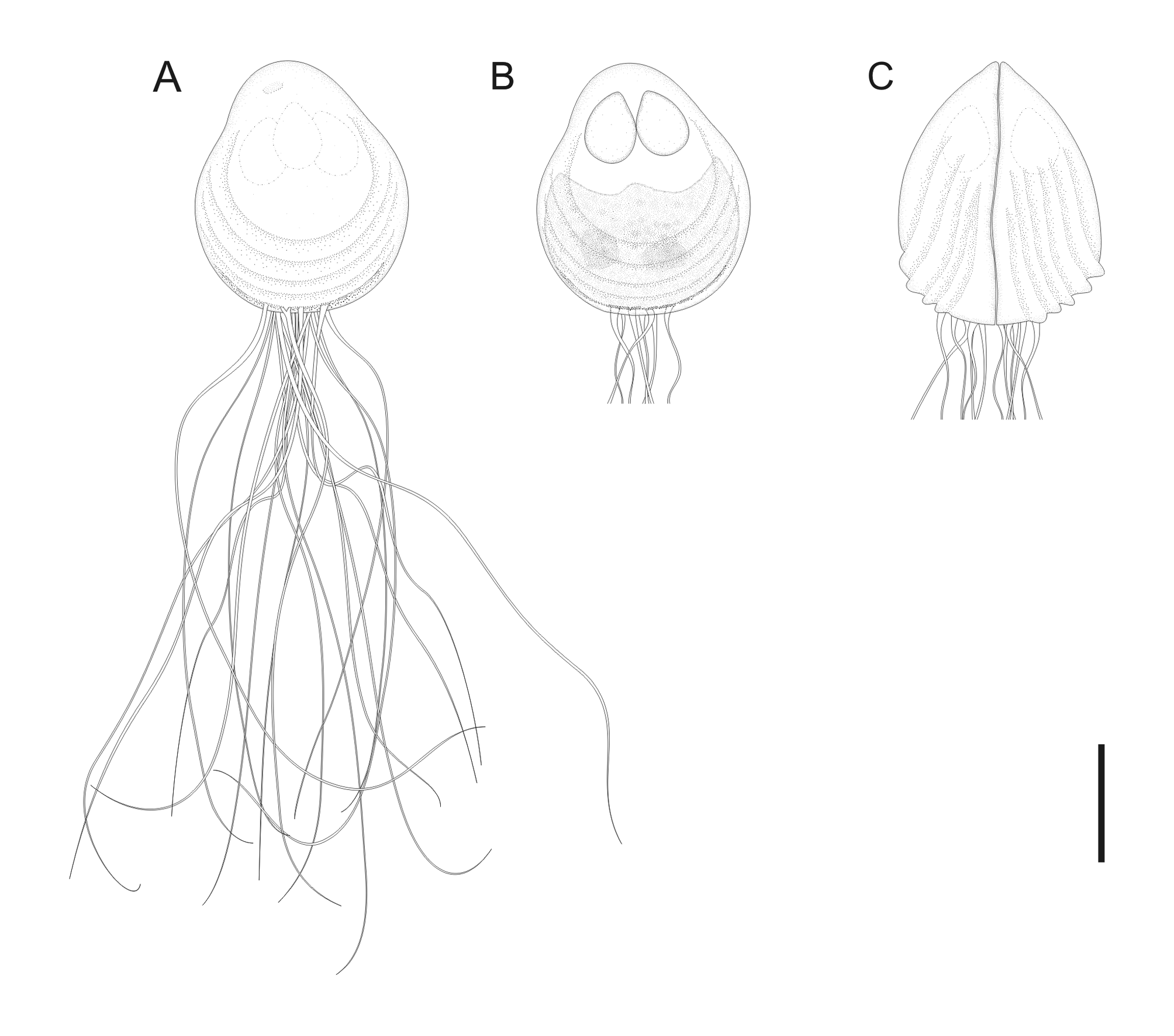
Chloromyxum zearaji
