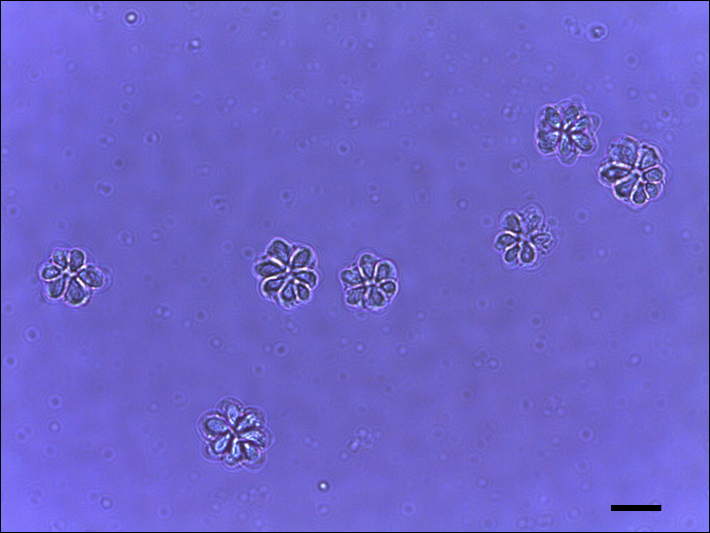
- Kudoa septempunctata - spores

Scientific classification
- Kingdom: Animalia
- Phylum: Cnidaria
- Subphylum: Myxozoa
- Class: Myxosporea; Buetchli, 1881

Orders
- Bivalvulida; Multivalvulida

Synonyms
- Actinomyxea; Actinosporea

= Myxosporea =

Subclass of microscopic animal parasites

Myxosporea is a subclass of microscopic animals, all of whom are parasites. They belong to the Myxozoa clade within Cnidaria. They have a complex life cycle that comprises vegetative forms in two hosts—one an aquatic invertebrate (generally an annelid but sometimes a bryozoan) and the other an ectothermic vertebrate, usually a fish. Each parasitized host releases a different type of spore. The two forms of spore are so different in appearance that until relatively recently they were treated as belonging to different classes within the Myxozoa.

== Taxonomic status ==
The taxonomy of both actinosporeans and myxosporeans was originally based on spore morphology. In 1994 the phylum Myxozoa was redefined to solve the taxonomic and nomenclatural problems arising from the two-host life cycle of myxozoans. The distinction between the two previously recognised classes Actinosporea and Myxosporea disappeared and the class Actinosporea was suppressed, becoming a synonym of the class Myxosporea (Bütschli, 1881). The generic names of actinosporeans were retained as collective "type" names, and it was proposed that they be used to characterise different morphological forms of actinosporeans. Those remaining actinosporeans whose myxosporean stage is unattested are being retained as species inquirenda until their specific identity is established.

It has been hypothesized that myxosporeans might have evolved from a transmissible tumor of Polypodium. This hypothesis is called the "SCANDAL hypothesis", an acronym for speciation by cancer development animals, referencing its radical nature.

== Transmission ==
Until the 1980s, direct transmission of myxosporeans was presumed. In 1984, it was shown experimentally that spores of Myxobolus cerebralis failed to produce infections when fed to salmonids. To reproduce successfully, this species requires a tubificid worm as an intermediate host, in which the spores develop into a "species" of the "genus" Triactinomyxon. These spores develop inside the oligochaete into forms which are infectious to salmonids.

Such a life cycle—with two different sexual stages, each resulting in two kinds of resistant spores—is unique amongst parasitic organisms, let alone those in the kingdom of animals. This mode of life has been confirmed in several other Myxobolus species. This vector has also been proved in other families. Ceratonova shasta, an economically important parasite of salmonids, has been shown to use a polychaete worm as an alternate host.

Direct transmission between fish has also been demonstrated, so far in three species of Enteromyxum.

Examples of myxosporean genera are Kudoa, which attacks fish muscle, and Myxobolus, which attacks the hearts of freshwater fish.
