= Aeromonas dhakensis =

Scientific classification
- Domain: Bacteria
- Kingdom: Pseudomonadati
- Phylum: Pseudomonadota
- Class: Gammaproteobacteria
- Order: Aeromonadales
- Family: Aeromonadaceae
- Genus: Aeromonas
- Species: A. dhakensis

Binomial name
- Aeromonas dhakensis (Huys et al. 2002) Beaz-Hidalgo et al. 2015

Synonyms
- Aeromonas aquariorum

Species of bacterium

Aeromonas dhakensis is a Gram-negative bacterium first isolated from aquariums in Portugal in 2005. The species is globally distributed in aquatic environments, like other species in the genus Aeromonas.

== Isolation ==
A. dhakensis was first isolated in 2005 from samples obtained from fish aquariums in Porto, Portugal and named A. aquariorum. Aeromonas species are widely distributed in aquatic environments. Prior to the discovery of A. dhakensis, the most prevalent species identified were A. hydrophila, A. caviae, and A. veronii. Once identified, researchers found the species to be globally distributed in aquatic environments, similar to the other members of the genus. Due to its similarity to A. hydrophila, A. dhakensis went unrecognized prior to 2005. The two species differ in that A. hydrophila is able to produce acid from L-arabinose, while A. dhakensis cannot. A. hydrophila is also less likely to use citrate as a carbon source than A. dhakensis. Because of its similarity to other species of Aeromonas, A. dhakensis was identified using DNA-DNA hybridization techniques, which identified the strains as a unique species of Aeromonas. Researchers focused on rpoD and gyrB genes, which clearly identified the strains as a new species distinct from A. hydrophila. In 2013, A. aquariorum was formally reclassified as A. dhakensis.

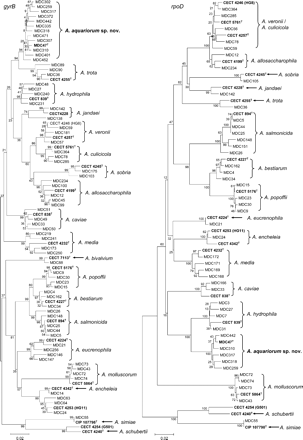
Phylogenetic tree showing the relationship of A. dhakensis to other members of the Aeromonas based on gyrB and rpoD gene sequences

== General characteristics ==
A. dhakensis is a rod-shaped bacterium. Cells contain a single polar flagellum, so are motile. The organism tests positive for the ability to produce catalases and oxidases, and is capable of reducing nitrate to nitrite. The species is able to undergo both respiration and fermentation. Strains are able to grow on MacConkey agar with an optimal growth temperature of 30–37 °C. Strains of A. dhakensis that have been isolated are resistant to various beta-lactam antibiotics, including ampicillin, and other antibiotics such as erythromycin.

Like its relative A. hydrophila, A. dhakensis is an opportunistic pathogen, playing a role in gastrointestinal diseases, particularly gastroenteritis. The species is also responsible for diseases in fish and amphibians. Treatment for an infection is the same as treatment for a A. hydrophila infection, with some antibiotics like tetracycline being effective against the pathogen. Terramycin can be placed in aquatic environments to help prevent infections in fish by A. dhakensis.
