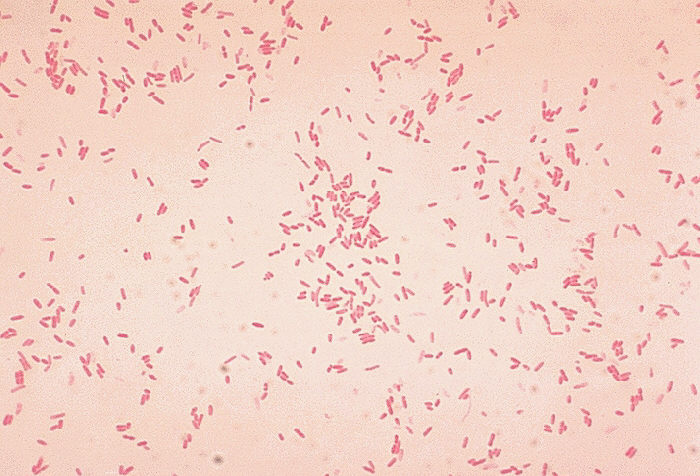

Scientific classification
- Domain: Bacteria
- Kingdom: Pseudomonadati
- Phylum: Pseudomonadota
- Class: Gammaproteobacteria
- Order: Aeromonadales
- Family: Aeromonadaceae
- Genus: Aeromonas
- Species: A. hydrophila

Binomial name
- Aeromonas hydrophila (Chester, 1901); Stanier, 1943

Synonyms
- Bacillus hydrophilus fuscus Sanarelli 1871; Bacillus hydrophilus Chester 1901; Proteus hydrophilus (Chester 1901) Bergey et al. 1923; Bacterium hydrophilum (Chester 1901) Weldin and Levine 1923; Pseudomonas hydrophila (Chester 1901) Breed et al. 1948

= Aeromonas hydrophila =

Species of heterotrophic, Gram-negative, bacterium

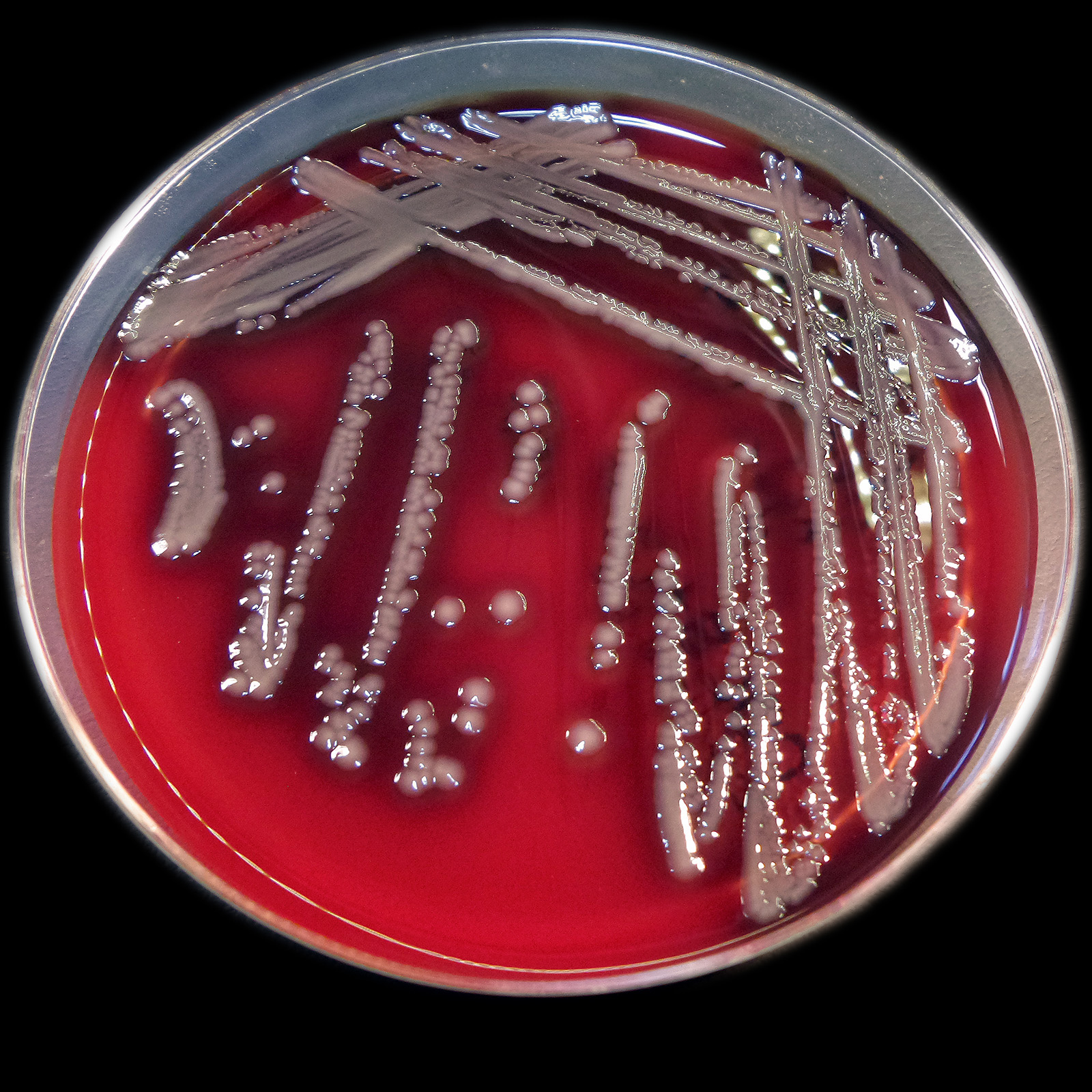
Aeromonas hydrophila colonies on the blood agar.

Aeromonas hydrophila is a heterotrophic, Gram-negative, rod-shaped bacterium mainly found in areas with a warm climate. This bacterium can be found in fresh or brackish water. It can survive in aerobic and anaerobic environments, and can digest materials such as gelatin and hemoglobin. A. hydrophila was isolated from humans and animals in the 1950s. It is the best known of the species of Aeromonas. It is resistant to most common antibiotics and cold temperatures and is oxidase- and indole-positive. Aeromonas hydrophila also has a symbiotic relationship as gut flora inside of certain leeches, such as Hirudo medicinalis.

== Structure ==
Aeromonas hydrophila bacteria are Gram-negative, straight rods with rounded ends (bacilli to coccibacilli shape) usually from 0.3 to 1.0 μm in width and 1.0 to 3.0 μm in length. They can grow at temperatures as low as 4 °C. These bacteria are motile by a polar flagellum.

== Pathology ==
Because of its structure, it is very toxic to many organisms. When it enters the body of its victim, it travels through the bloodstream to the first available organ. It produces aerolysin, a cytotoxic enterotoxin that can cause tissue damage. A. hydrophila, A. caviae, and A. sobria are all considered to be opportunistic pathogens, meaning they rarely infect healthy individuals. A. hydrophila is widely considered a major fish and amphibian pathogen, and its pathogenicity in humans has been recognized for decades. The genomic insights of aeromonas could be a stepping stone into understanding of them

== Pathogenic mechanism ==
The pathogenicity of Aeromonas species was believed to be mediated by a number of extracellular proteins such as aerolysin, lipase, chitinase, amylase, gelatinase, hemolysins, and enterotoxins. However, the pathogenic mechanisms are unknown. The recently proposed type-III secretion system (T3SS) has been linked to Aeromonas pathogenesis. T3SS is a specialized protein secretion machinery that exports virulence factors directly to host cells. These factors subvert normal host cell functions to the benefit of invading bacteria. In contrast to the general secretory pathway, the T3SS is triggered when a pathogen comes in contact with host cells. ADP-ribosylation toxin is one of the effector molecules secreted by several pathogenic bacteria and translocated through the T3SS and delivered into the host cytoplasm, which leads to interruption of the NF-κB pathway, cytoskeletal damage, and apoptosis. This toxin has been characterized in A. hydrophila (human diarrhoeal isolate), A. salmonicida (fish pathogen), and A. jandaei GV17, a pathogenic strain that can cause disease both in humans and fish.

== Occurrence of exposure ==
Aeromonas hydrophila infections occur most often during sexual changes, stressors, changes in temperature, in contaminated environments, and when an organism is already infected with a virus or another bacterium. It can also be ingested through food products contaminated with the bacterium, such as seafood, meats, and even certain vegetables such as sprouts. It can also be transmitted by leeches.

== Fish and amphibians ==
Aeromonas hydrophila is associated with diseases mainly found in freshwater fish and amphibians, because these organisms live in aquatic environments. It is linked to a disease found in frogs called red leg, which causes internal, sometimes fatal hemorrhaging. When infected with A. hydrophila, fish develop ulcers, tail rot, fin rot, and hemorrhagic septicemia. Hemorrhagic septicaemia causes lesions that lead to scale shedding, hemorrhages in the gills and anal area, ulcers, exophthalmia, and abdominal swelling.

== Human diseases ==
Aeromonas hydrophila is not as pathogenic to humans as it is to fish and amphibians. One of the diseases it can cause in humans, gastroenteritis, occurs mostly in young children and people who have compromised immune systems or growth problems. This bacterium is linked to two types of gastroenteritis. The first type is a disease similar to cholera, which causes rice-water diarrhea. The other type is dysenteric gastroenteritis, which causes loose stools filled with blood and mucus. Dysenteric gastroenteritis is the most severe out of the two types and can last for several weeks. A. hydrophila is also associated with cellulitis. It also causes diseases such as myonecrosis and eczema in people with compromised or suppressed (by medication) immune systems. In very rare cases, A. hydrophila can cause necrotizing fasciitis.

== Outbreaks ==
Though A. hydrophila can cause serious disease, large scale outbreaks have not been reported. Outbreaks among vertebrates have occurred. One such incident occurred in Puerto Rico inside the intestinal tracts of lizards. Some 116 different strains were found in the lizards. On May 1, 1988, a small outbreak happened in California.The 225 isolates in 219 patients caused their hospital admissions. Confidential morbidity report cards were used to report the cases to the local health departments. Investigations were conducted, and reports were sent to the California Department of Health Services for diagnosis and methods in treatment.

== Treatments ==
Aeromonas hydrophila can be eliminated using a 1% sodium hypochlorite solution or 2% calcium hypochlorite solution. Brage et al., 1990 recommends fluoroquinolone administration as prophylactic treatment during medicinal leech application. Antibiotics such as chloramphenicol, florfenicol, tetracycline, sulfonamide, nitrofuran derivatives, and Pyridinecarboxylic acids are used to eliminate and control the infection of A. hydrophila. Terramycin is placed in fish food during hatchery operations as another chemotherapeutic agent in preventing A. hydrophila. However, study in fish showed that, like many other antimicrobial agents, the use of antibiotics may cause gut dysbiosis and result in increased susceptibility to opportunistic pathogens after the short withdrawal period.

S.I. Paul et al. (2021) isolated and identified probiotic Bacillus subtilis strain WS1A that can inhibit the growth of pathogenic Aeromonas in fish. Bacillus subtilis strain WS1A produces different types of potential antimicrobial peptides. Fish (Labeo rohita) fed with extracellular products of Bacillus subtilis strain WS1A develop disease resistance against motile Aeromonas septicemia. Bacillus subtilis strain WS1A boosts immunity of treated fish. This strain was isolated from marine sponge of Saint Martin's Island in the Bay of Bengal, Bangladesh.
