= Aeromonas jandaei =

Scientific classification
- Domain: Bacteria
- Kingdom: Pseudomonadati
- Phylum: Pseudomonadota
- Class: Gammaproteobacteria
- Order: Aeromonadales
- Family: Aeromonadaceae
- Genus: Aeromonas
- Species: A. jandaei

Binomial name
- Aeromonas jandaei Carnahan et al. 1992

Type strain
- A 1642, ATCC 49568, BCRC 15862, Carnahan CDC0787-80, CCM 4355, CCRC 15862, CCTM 3019, CCUG 29543, CCUG 30349, CCUG 30353, CDC 0787-80, CECT 4228, CIP 104171, CIP 10471, CNCTC 5357, CNCTC Aer 107/91, DSM 7311, JCM 8316, LMG 12221, LMG 13704

Species of bacterium

Aeromonas jandaei is a Gram-negative bacterium of the genus Aeromonas isolated from human feces in Oregon.
