= Zobellella maritima =

Scientific classification
- Domain: Bacteria
- Kingdom: Pseudomonadati
- Phylum: Pseudomonadota
- Class: Gammaproteobacteria
- Order: Aeromonadales
- Family: Aeromonadaceae
- Genus: Zobellella
- Species: Z. maritima

Binomial name
- Zobellella maritima Lee et al. 2018

Type strain
- DSM 106043, JCM 32359, KCTC 62272, strain 102-Py4

Genus of bacteria

Zobellella maritima is a Gram-negative, aerobic, rod-shaped and motile bacterium from the genus of Zobellella which has been isolated from the beach of Sinduri in Korea. Zobellella maritima is able to degrade polycyclic aromatic hydrocarbons.
