= Oceanimonas doudoroffii =

Scientific classification
- Domain: Bacteria
- Kingdom: Pseudomonadati
- Phylum: Pseudomonadota
- Class: Gammaproteobacteria
- Order: Aeromonadales
- Family: Aeromonadaceae
- Genus: Oceanimonas
- Species: O. doudoroffii

Binomial name
- Oceanimonas doudoroffii corrig. (Baumann et al. 1972); Brown et al. 2001

Synonyms
- Pseudomonas doudoroffii Baumann et al. 1972

Species of bacterium

Oceanimonas doudoroffii is a Gram-negative marine bacterium. The rod-shaped, motile bacterium is aerobic and chemoorganotroph.
