= Aeromonas simiae =

Scientific classification
- Domain: Bacteria
- Kingdom: Pseudomonadati
- Phylum: Pseudomonadota
- Class: Gammaproteobacteria
- Order: Aeromonadales
- Family: Aeromonadaceae
- Genus: Aeromonas
- Species: A. simiae

Binomial name
- Aeromonas simiae Harf-Monteil et al. 2004

Type strain
- CCM 7234, CCUG 47378, CIP 10778T, CIP 107798, DSM 16559, IBS S6874, LMG 22269

Species of bacterium

Aeromonas simiae is a Gram-negative, oxidase- and catalase-positive motile bacterium of the genus Aeromonas, with a polar flagellum, isolated from the faeces of a healthy monkey (Macaca fascicularis).
