= Aeromonas piscicola =

Scientific classification
- Domain: Bacteria
- Kingdom: Pseudomonadati
- Phylum: Pseudomonadota
- Class: Gammaproteobacteria
- Order: Aeromonadales
- Family: Aeromonadaceae
- Genus: Aeromonas
- Species: A. piscicola

Binomial name
- Aeromonas piscicola Beaz-Hidalgo et al. 2010

Type strain
- CCM 7715, CECT 7443, LMG 24783, Romalde S1.2

Species of bacterium

Aeromonas piscicola is a Gram-negative, catalase and oxidase-positive bacterium of the genus Aeromonas isolated from diseased fish in Spain
