= Oceanisphaera profunda =

Scientific classification
- Domain: Bacteria
- Kingdom: Pseudomonadati
- Phylum: Pseudomonadota
- Class: Gammaproteobacteria
- Order: Aeromonadales
- Family: Aeromonadaceae
- Genus: Oceanisphaera
- Species: O. profunda

Binomial name
- Oceanisphaera profunda Xu et al. 2014

Type strain
- CCTCC AB 2013241, KCTC 32510, strain SM1222

Synonyms
- Oceanisphaera nanhaiensis

Genus of bacteria

Oceanisphaera profunda is a Gram-negative and aerobic bacterium from the genus of Oceanisphaera which has been isolated from deep-sea sediments from the South China Sea.
