= Aeromonas bivalvium =

Scientific classification
- Domain: Bacteria
- Kingdom: Pseudomonadati
- Phylum: Pseudomonadota
- Class: Gammaproteobacteria
- Order: Aeromonadales
- Family: Aeromonadaceae
- Genus: Aeromonas
- Species: A. bivalvium

Binomial name
- Aeromonas bivalvium Miñana-Galbis et al. 2007

Type strain
- CECT 7113, CIP 109539, DSM 19111, KCTC 22102, LMG 23376, 868E

Species of bacterium

Aeromonas bivalvium is a Gram-negative, oxidase- and catalase-positive, motile bacterium with a polar flagellum of the genus Aeromonas isolated from bivalve molluscs.
