= Aeromonas lacus =

Scientific classification
- Domain: Bacteria
- Kingdom: Pseudomonadati
- Phylum: Pseudomonadota
- Class: Gammaproteobacteria
- Order: Aeromonadales
- Family: Aeromonadaceae
- Genus: Aeromonas
- Species: A. finlandensis

Binomial name
- Aeromonas finlandensis Beaz-Hidalgo et al. 2015

Type strain
- AE122, AE204, CECT 8024, LMG 26710

Species of bacterium

Aeromonas lacus is a bacterium from the genus Aeromonas which has been isolated from a humic lake in Huutjärvi in Finland.
