= Tolumonas auensis =

Scientific classification
- Domain: Bacteria
- Kingdom: Pseudomonadati
- Phylum: Pseudomonadota
- Class: Gammaproteobacteria
- Order: Aeromonadales
- Family: Aeromonadaceae
- Genus: Tolumonas
- Species: T. auensis

Binomial name
- Tolumonas auensis Fischer-Romero et al., 1996

Species of bacterium

Tolumonas auensis is a Gram-negative, rod-shaped bacterium in the genus Tolumonas. It has been studied as a biological producer of toluene from phenylalanine and other phenyl precursors.
