= Aeromonas tecta =

Scientific classification
- Domain: Bacteria
- Kingdom: Pseudomonadati
- Phylum: Pseudomonadota
- Class: Gammaproteobacteria
- Order: Aeromonadales
- Family: Aeromonadaceae
- Genus: Aeromonas
- Species: A. tecta

Binomial name
- Aeromonas tecta Demarta et al. 2010

Type strain
- CCM 7605, CECT 7082, DSM 17300, F518, LMG 24874, MDC 91

Species of bacterium

Aeromonas tecta is a Gram-negative bacterium of the genus Aeromonas isolated from stool of a child with diarrhoea, a healthy patient, and environmental sources.
