= Aeromonas bestiarum =

Scientific classification
- Domain: Bacteria
- Kingdom: Pseudomonadati
- Phylum: Pseudomonadota
- Class: Gammaproteobacteria
- Order: Aeromonadales
- Family: Aeromonadaceae
- Genus: Aeromonas
- Species: A. bestiarum

Binomial name
- Aeromonas bestiarum Ali et al. 1996

Type strain
- Altwegg A307, ATCC 51108, ATCC 700183, BCRC 17451, CCM 4707, CCRC 17451, CCUG 41859, CDC 9533-76, CECT 4227, CIP 74.30, CIP 7430, DSM 13956, LMG 12157, LMG 13444, LMG 3751, NCIMB 13586, Popoff 218

Species of bacterium

Aeromonas bestiarum is a Gram-negative bacterium of the genus Aeromonas which can cause infection in carp (Cyprinus carpio). A. bestiarum is a growing problem in Poland in commercial carp farms.
