= Oceanisphaera ostreae =

Scientific classification
- Domain: Bacteria
- Kingdom: Pseudomonadati
- Phylum: Pseudomonadota
- Class: Gammaproteobacteria
- Order: Aeromonadales
- Family: Aeromonadaceae
- Genus: Oceanisphaera
- Species: O. ostreae

Binomial name
- Oceanisphaera ostreae Choi et al. 2011

Type strain
- CCUG 60525, KCTC 23422, strain T-w6

Synonyms
- Oceanisphaera ostrea

Genus of bacteria

Oceanisphaera ostreae is a Gram-negative, non-spore-forming and motile bacterium from the genus of Oceanisphaera which has been isolated from seawater from an oyster farm from the South Sea in Korea.
