= Zobellella denitrificans =

Scientific classification
- Domain: Bacteria
- Kingdom: Pseudomonadati
- Phylum: Pseudomonadota
- Class: Gammaproteobacteria
- Order: Aeromonadales
- Family: Aeromonadaceae
- Genus: Zobellella
- Species: Z. denitrificans

Binomial name
- Zobellella denitrificans Lin and Shieh 2006

Type strain
- BCRC 17493, JCM 13380, strain ZD1

Genus of bacteria

Zobellella denitrificans is a gram-negative, facultatively anaerobic, heterotrophic and denitrifying bacterium from the genus of Zobellella which has been isolated from sediments from a mangrove ecosystems from Miaoli County in Taiwan.

Recent research on Z. denitrificans ZD1 has highlighted its versatile applications in biotechnology and aquaculture. This salt-tolerant strain can produce high poly(3-hydroxybutyrate) (PHB), a biodegradable biopolymer, from various organic waste sources, including synthetic crude glycerol, saline wastewater, and municipal wastewater. It can also grow on other agro-industrial wastewaters to produce PHB, including sugary waste slurry, cheese whey wastewater, food waste fermentation liquid, and fishmeal wastewater. This non-sterile PHB production process offers a low-cost strategy for recycling organic waste into valuable bioplastics, reducing reliance on petrochemical-based plastics.

Furthermore, Z. denitrificans ZD1 shows potential as a multifunctional feed ingredient for aquaculture. When utilized as single-cell protein (SCP) rich in PHB, ZD1 can enhance the growth, immune response, and gut microbiome health of various aquatic species. PHB and its intermediates exhibit antimicrobial properties against common aquaculture pathogens, providing an alternative to traditional antibiotics. This dual capability of Z. denitrificans ZD1 to produce bioplastics and serve as a sustainable feed ingredient supports its promising role in addressing environmental challenges in aquaculture.
