= Aeromonas punctata =

Scientific classification
- Domain: Bacteria
- Kingdom: Pseudomonadati
- Phylum: Pseudomonadota
- Class: Gammaproteobacteria
- Order: Aeromonadales
- Family: Aeromonadaceae
- Genus: Aeromonas
- Species: A. punctata

Binomial name
- Aeromonas punctata (Zimmermann 1890); Snieszko 1957

Synonyms
- Bacillus punctatus Zimmermann 1890; Pseudomonas punctata (Zimmermann 1890) Chester 1901; Aeromonas caviae Eddy 1962

Species of bacterium

Aeromonas punctata is a synonym of Aeromonas caviae. The bacterium is found in sewage, fresh water and in animals.
