= Oceanisphaera arctica =

Scientific classification
- Domain: Bacteria
- Kingdom: Pseudomonadati
- Phylum: Pseudomonadota
- Class: Gammaproteobacteria
- Order: Aeromonadales
- Family: Aeromonadaceae
- Genus: Oceanisphaera
- Species: O. arctica

Binomial name
- Oceanisphaera arctica Srinivas et al. 2012

Type strain
- CCUG 58690, KCTC 23013, NBRC 106171, strain V1-41

Genus of bacteria

Oceanisphaera arctica is a Gram-negative, coccoid and non-motile bacterium from the genus of Oceanisphaera which has been isolated from marine sediments from Kongsfjorden.
