= Aeromonas popoffii =

Scientific classification
- Domain: Bacteria
- Kingdom: Pseudomonadati
- Phylum: Pseudomonadota
- Class: Gammaproteobacteria
- Order: Aeromonadales
- Family: Aeromonadaceae
- Genus: Aeromonas
- Species: A. popoffii

Binomial name
- Aeromonas popoffii Huys et al. 1997

Type strain
- ATCC BAA-243, BCRC 17452, CCM 4708, CCRC 17452, CCUG 39350, CECT 5176, CIP 105493, DSM 19604, IK-O-a-10-3, LMG 17541, NCIMB 13618

Species of bacterium

Aeromonas popoffii is a Gram-negative bacterium of the genus Aeromonas isolated from drinking water production plants and reservoirs in Oelegem, Belgium, and in Scotland.
