= Aeromonas encheleia =

Scientific classification
- Domain: Bacteria
- Kingdom: Pseudomonadati
- Phylum: Pseudomonadota
- Class: Gammaproteobacteria
- Order: Aeromonadales
- Family: Aeromonadaceae
- Genus: Aeromonas
- Species: A. encheleia

Binomial name
- Aeromonas encheleia Esteve et al. 1995

Type strain
- A 1881, ATCC 51929, BCRC 17450, CCM 4582, CCRC 17450, CCUG 50738, CECT 4342, CIP 104608, DSM 11577, Esteve S181, LMG 16330, LMG 17869, LMG 21942, NCIMB 13442, NCTC 12917

Species of bacterium

Aeromonas encheleia is a gram-negative, motile bacterium of the genus Aeromonas isolated from European eels in Valencia, Spain.
