= Aeromonas enteropelogenes =

Scientific classification
- Domain: Bacteria
- Kingdom: Pseudomonadati
- Phylum: Pseudomonadota
- Class: Gammaproteobacteria
- Order: Aeromonadales
- Family: Aeromonadaceae
- Genus: Aeromonas
- Species: A. enteropelogenes

Binomial name
- Aeromonas enteropelogenes Schubert et al. 1991

Type strain
- ATCC 49803, BCRC 15865, CCM 7243, CCRC 15865, CECT 4487, CIP 104434, DSM 6394, JCM 8355, LMG 12646, NCIMB 13209, Sanyal J11

Synonyms
- Aeromonas trota, Aeromonas tructi

Species of bacterium

Aeromonas enteropelogenes is a Gram-negative, motile bacterium of the genus Aeromonas isolated from human stool in Varanasi, in India.
