= Aeromonas rivuli =

Scientific classification
- Domain: Bacteria
- Kingdom: Pseudomonadati
- Phylum: Pseudomonadota
- Class: Gammaproteobacteria
- Order: Aeromonadales
- Family: Aeromonadaceae
- Genus: Aeromonas
- Species: A. rivuli

Binomial name
- Aeromonas rivuli Figueras et al. 2011

Type strain
- CECT 7518, DSM 22539, MDC 2511, WB4.1-19

Species of bacterium

Aeromonas rivuli is a Gram-negative, oxidase- and catalase-positive, non-spore-forming bacterium with a polar flagellum of the genus Aeromonas isolated from Westerhöfer Bach in Harz in Germany.
