= Oceanisphaera litoralis =

Scientific classification
- Domain: Bacteria
- Kingdom: Pseudomonadati
- Phylum: Pseudomonadota
- Class: Gammaproteobacteria
- Order: Aeromonadales
- Family: Aeromonadaceae
- Genus: Oceanisphaera
- Species: O. litoralis

Binomial name
- Oceanisphaera litoralis Romanenko et al. 2003

Type strain
- DSM 15406, KMM 3654

Genus of bacteria

Oceanisphaera litoralis is a Gram-negative, aerobic and moderately halophilic bacterium from the genus of Oceanisphaera which has been isolated from sediments from the Sea of Japan in Russia.
