= Tolumonas osonensis =

Scientific classification
- Domain: Bacteria
- Kingdom: Pseudomonadati
- Phylum: Pseudomonadota
- Class: Gammaproteobacteria
- Order: Aeromonadales
- Family: Aeromonadaceae
- Genus: Tolumonas
- Species: T. osonensis

Binomial name
- Tolumonas osonensis Caldwell et al., 2011

Species of bacterium

Tolumonas osonensis is a Gram-negative, rod-shaped bacterium in the genus Tolumonas. It has been studied as a biological producer of ethanol and lactate.
