= Oceanimonas smirnovii =

Scientific classification
- Domain: Bacteria
- Kingdom: Pseudomonadati
- Phylum: Pseudomonadota
- Class: Gammaproteobacteria
- Order: Aeromonadales
- Family: Aeromonadaceae
- Genus: Oceanimonas
- Species: O. smirnovii

Binomial name
- Oceanimonas smirnovii Ivanova et al. 2005

Type strain
- ATCC BAA-899, LMG 22147, UCM B-11076, strain 31-13

Genus of bacteria

Oceanimonas smirnovii is a Gram-negative, aerobic, melanogenic and chemoorganotrophic bacterium from the genus of Oceanimonas which has been isolated from the Black Sea.
