= Zobellella endophytica =

Scientific classification
- Domain: Bacteria
- Kingdom: Pseudomonadati
- Phylum: Pseudomonadota
- Class: Gammaproteobacteria
- Order: Aeromonadales
- Family: Aeromonadaceae
- Genus: Zobellella
- Species: Z. endophytica

Binomial name
- Zobellella endophytica Song et al. 2018

Type strain
- ACCC:60074, KCTC:62456, strain 59N8

Genus of bacteria

Zobellella endophytica is a Gram-negative, non-spore-forming, rod-shaped, aerobic and motile bacterium from the genus of Zobellella which has been isolated from the roots of the plant Phragmites communis from the Kumtag Desert.
