= Aeromonas diversa =

Scientific classification
- Domain: Bacteria
- Kingdom: Pseudomonadati
- Phylum: Pseudomonadota
- Class: Gammaproteobacteria
- Order: Aeromonadales
- Family: Aeromonadaceae
- Genus: Aeromonas
- Species: A. diversa

Binomial name
- Aeromonas diversa Miñana-Galbis et al. 2010

Type strain
- ATCC 43946, CCM 7325, CDC 2478-85, CECT 4254, LMG 17321

Species of bacterium

Aeromonas diversa is a Gram-negative, facultative anaerobic bacterium of the genus Aeromonas isolated from the leg wound of a patient in New Orleans.
