= Aeromonas taiwanensis =

Scientific classification
- Domain: Bacteria
- Kingdom: Pseudomonadati
- Phylum: Pseudomonadota
- Class: Gammaproteobacteria
- Order: Aeromonadales
- Family: Aeromonadaceae
- Genus: Aeromonas
- Species: A. taiwanensis

Binomial name
- Aeromonas taiwanensis Alperi et al. 2010

Type strain
- A2-50, CECT 7403, CIP 110204, LMG 24683

Species of bacterium

Aeromonas taiwanensis is a Gram-negative, oxidase- and catalase-positive, non-spore-forming, motile bacterium of the genus Aeromonas isolated from wounds of patients in Taiwan.
