= Pseudaeromonas pectinilytica =

Scientific classification
- Domain: Bacteria
- Kingdom: Pseudomonadati
- Phylum: Pseudomonadota
- Class: Gammaproteobacteria
- Order: Aeromonadales
- Family: Aeromonadaceae
- Genus: Pseudaeromonas
- Species: P. pectinilytica

Binomial name
- Pseudaeromonas pectinilytica Padakandla and Chae 2017

Type strain
- JCM 31503, KCTC 42754, strain AR1

Synonyms
- Manjusharmia pectinolytica

Genus of bacteria

Pseudaeromonas pectinilytica is a Gram-negative, rod-shaped facultatively anaerobic and motile bacterium from the genus of Pseudaeromonas which has been isolated from a freshwater stream from Jeonju in Korea.
