= Aeromonas molluscorum =

Scientific classification
- Domain: Bacteria
- Kingdom: Pseudomonadati
- Phylum: Pseudomonadota
- Class: Gammaproteobacteria
- Order: Aeromonadales
- Family: Aeromonadaceae
- Genus: Aeromonas
- Species: A. molluscorum

Binomial name
- Aeromonas molluscorum Miñana-Galbis et al. 2004

Type strain
- 848T, BCRC 17453, CCM 7245, CCRC 17453, CCUG 50741, CECT 5864, CIP 108676, DSM 17090, LMG 22214

Species of bacterium

Aeromonas molluscorum is a Gram-negative, oxidase- and catalase-positive, motile bacterium with a polar flagellum of the genus Aeromonas which was isolated from bivalve molluscs (wedge shells - Donax trunculus).
