= Aeromonas fluvialis =

Scientific classification
- Domain: Bacteria
- Kingdom: Pseudomonadati
- Phylum: Pseudomonadota
- Class: Gammaproteobacteria
- Order: Aeromonadales
- Family: Aeromonadaceae
- Genus: Aeromonas
- Species: A. fluvialis

Binomial name
- Aeromonas fluvialis Alperi et al. 2010

Type strain
- CECT 7401, CIP 110205, LMG 24681, strain 717

Species of bacterium

Aeromonas fluvialis is a Gram-negative, oxidase- and catalase-positive, facultatively anaerobic, non-spore-forming bacterium of the genus Aeromonas isolated from water from the Muga River in Girona in northeastern Spain.
