= Oceanisphaera marina =

Scientific classification
- Domain: Bacteria
- Kingdom: Pseudomonadati
- Phylum: Pseudomonadota
- Class: Gammaproteobacteria
- Order: Aeromonadales
- Family: Aeromonadaceae
- Genus: Oceanisphaera
- Species: O. marina

Binomial name
- Oceanisphaera marina Liu et al. 2017

Type strain
- CGMCC 1.15923, KACC 18564, strain YM319

Genus of bacteria

Oceanisphaera marina is a Gram-negative, strictly aerobic, rod-shaped and motile bacterium from the genus of Oceanisphaera which has been isolated from a seamount from the western Pacific.
