= Tolumonas lignilytica =

Scientific classification
- Domain: Bacteria
- Kingdom: Pseudomonadati
- Phylum: Pseudomonadota
- Class: Gammaproteobacteria
- Order: Aeromonadales
- Family: Aeromonadaceae
- Genus: Tolumonas
- Species: T. lignilytica

Binomial name
- Tolumonas lignilytica (Billings et al. 2015) Billings et al. 2016

Type strain
- ATCC TSD-11, DSM 100457, BRL6-1

Synonyms
- Tolumonas lignolytica

Species of bacterium

Tolumonas lignilytica is a Gram-negative, non-spore-forming and mesophilic bacterium belonging to the genus of Tolumonas which has been isolated from tropical rainforest soil.
