= Oceanisphaera aquimarina =

Scientific classification
- Domain: Bacteria
- Kingdom: Pseudomonadati
- Phylum: Pseudomonadota
- Class: Gammaproteobacteria
- Order: Aeromonadales
- Family: Aeromonadaceae
- Genus: Oceanisphaera
- Species: O. aquimarina

Binomial name
- Oceanisphaera aquimarina Cho and Lee 2016

Genus of bacteria

Oceanisphaera aquimarina is a Gram-negative, aerobic and motile bacterium from the genus of Oceanisphaera.
