= Aeromonas allosaccharophila =

Scientific classification
- Domain: Bacteria
- Kingdom: Pseudomonadati
- Phylum: Pseudomonadota
- Class: Gammaproteobacteria
- Order: Aeromonadales
- Family: Aeromonadaceae
- Genus: Aeromonas
- Species: A. allosaccharophila

Binomial name
- Aeromonas allosaccharophila Martinez-Murcia et al. 1992

Type strain
- ATCC 51208, CCM 4363, CCUG 31218, CCUG 47180 A, CECT 4199, CIP 104616, CNCTC 5401, CNCTC Aer 145/92, DSM 11576, Esteve 289, LMG 14059, LMG 18227, NCIMB 13751

Species of bacterium

Aeromonas allosaccharophila is a Gram-negative, catalase-positive, motile bacterium from the genus of Aeromonas, which was isolated from ill elvers (Anguilla anguilla) in Valencia, Spain.
