= Aeromonas media =

Scientific classification
- Domain: Bacteria
- Kingdom: Pseudomonadati
- Phylum: Pseudomonadota
- Class: Gammaproteobacteria
- Order: Aeromonadales
- Family: Aeromonadaceae
- Genus: Aeromonas
- Species: A. media

Binomial name
- Aeromonas media Allen, Austin & Colwell, 1983

Species of bacterium

Aeromonas media is a species of bacteria. R_{M} (= ATCC 33907) is the type strain of this species.

== Description ==
It is Gram-negative and motile, and its rod-shaped cells are about 1 by 2 μm with rounded ends. Its metabolism is fermentative, and it produces catalase, oxidase, and arginine dihydrolase. It is susceptible to chlortetracycline, colistin sulfate, furazolidone, gentamicin, neomycin, nitrofurantoin, and tetracycline, but not to ampicillin, cloxacillin, novobiocin, or sulfafurazole.

It produces a bacteriocin-like inhibitory substance.
