= Aeromonas sanarellii =

Scientific classification
- Domain: Bacteria
- Kingdom: Pseudomonadati
- Phylum: Pseudomonadota
- Class: Gammaproteobacteria
- Order: Aeromonadales
- Family: Aeromonadaceae
- Genus: Aeromonas
- Species: A. sanarellii

Binomial name
- Aeromonas sanarellii Alperi et al. 2010

Type strain
- A2-67, CECT 7402, CIP 110203, LMG 24682

Species of bacterium

Aeromonas sanarellii is a Gram-negative, oxidase- and catalase-positive, non-spore-forming bacterium of the genus Aeromonas isolated from wounds of patients in a hospital in Taiwan.
