= Oceanisphaera avium =

Scientific classification
- Domain: Bacteria
- Kingdom: Pseudomonadati
- Phylum: Pseudomonadota
- Class: Gammaproteobacteria
- Order: Aeromonadales
- Family: Aeromonadaceae
- Genus: Oceanisphaera
- Species: O. avium

Binomial name
- Oceanisphaera avium Sung et al. 2018

Type strain
- JCM 32207, KCTC 62118, AMac2203

Genus of bacteria

Oceanisphaera avium is a Gram-negative and aerobic bacterium from the genus of Oceanisphaera which has been isolated from the gut of the raptorial bird Aegypius monachus from the Seoul Grand Park Zoo in South Korea.
