= Aeromonas eucrenophila =

Scientific classification
- Domain: Bacteria
- Kingdom: Pseudomonadati
- Phylum: Pseudomonadota
- Class: Gammaproteobacteria
- Order: Aeromonadales
- Family: Aeromonadaceae
- Genus: Aeromonas
- Species: A. eucrenophila

Binomial name
- Aeromonas eucrenophila Schubert and Hegazi 1988

Type strain
- A 311, ATCC 23309, BCRC 13017, BCRC 14134, CCE 8704, CCEB 704, CCM 4354, CCRC 13017, CCRC 14134, CCTM 885, CCUG 25942, CCUG 30340, CDC RH63, CECT 4224, CIP 76.17, CNCTC 5356, CNCTC Aer 106/91, DSM 17534, JCM 8238, LMG 10843, LMG 17871, LMG 3774, M. Popoff 546, NCIMB 74, NCMB 74, RH 63, USCC 2045

Species of bacterium

Aeromonas eucrenophila is a Gram-negative bacterium of the genus Aeromonas isolated from fresh water and infected fish. A. eucrenophila is a pathogen of fish, and it causes diarrhoea in humans.
