= Aeromonas schubertii =

Scientific classification
- Domain: Bacteria
- Kingdom: Pseudomonadati
- Phylum: Pseudomonadota
- Class: Gammaproteobacteria
- Order: Aeromonadales
- Family: Aeromonadaceae
- Genus: Aeromonas
- Species: A. schubertii

Binomial name
- Aeromonas schubertii Hickman-Brenner et al., 1988

Species of bacterium

Aeromonas schubertii is a Gram-negative, rod-shaped bacterium. Its type strain is ATCC 43700 (CDC 2446–81). It is differentiated from other species by not metabolising D-mannitol. It is resistant to ampicillin and carbenicillin and susceptible to most other agents. It causes infection in several species, including humans and Channa argus.
