= Aeromonas rivipollensis =

Scientific classification
- Domain: Bacteria
- Kingdom: Pseudomonadati
- Phylum: Pseudomonadota
- Class: Gammaproteobacteria
- Order: Aeromonadales
- Family: Aeromonadaceae
- Genus: Aeromonas
- Species: A. rivipollensis

Binomial name
- Aeromonas rivipollensis Marti and Balcázar 2016

Type strain
- P1A11, P2G1, DSM 24593, LMG 26313

Species of bacterium

Aeromonas rivipollensis is a Gram-negative, facultatively anaerobic, rod-shaped and motile bacterium from the genus Aeromonas which has been isolated from river sediments from the Ter River in Spain.
