= Aeromonas aquatica =

Scientific classification
- Domain: Bacteria
- Kingdom: Pseudomonadati
- Phylum: Pseudomonadota
- Class: Gammaproteobacteria
- Order: Aeromonadales
- Family: Aeromonadaceae
- Genus: Aeromonas
- Species: A. aquatica

Binomial name
- Aeromonas aquatica Beaz-Hidalgo et al. 2015

Type strain
- AE235, CECT 8025, HE157, CECT 8025, LMG 26712

Species of bacterium

Aeromonas aquatica is a bacterium from the genus Aeromonas which has been isolated from a humic lake in Haukkajärvi in Finland.
