= Aeromonas australiensis =

Scientific classification
- Domain: Bacteria
- Kingdom: Pseudomonadati
- Phylum: Pseudomonadota
- Class: Gammaproteobacteria
- Order: Aeromonadales
- Family: Aeromonadaceae
- Genus: Aeromonas
- Species: A. australiensis

Binomial name
- Aeromonas australiensis Aravena-Román et al. 2013

Type strain
- CECT 8023, Figueras 266, LMG 26707

Species of bacterium

Aeromonas australiensis is a Gram-negative, anaerobic bacterium from the genus Aeromonas isolated from an irrigation water system in Western Australia.
