= Oceanisphaera psychrotolerans =

Scientific classification
- Domain: Bacteria
- Kingdom: Pseudomonadati
- Phylum: Pseudomonadota
- Class: Gammaproteobacteria
- Order: Aeromonadales
- Family: Aeromonadaceae
- Genus: Oceanisphaera
- Species: O. psychrotolerans

Binomial name
- Oceanisphaera psychrotolerans Zhou et al. 2015

Type strain
- ACCC 06516, JCM 30466, LAM-WHM-ZC

Genus of bacteria

Oceanisphaera psychrotolerans is a Gram-negative, aerobic and non-motile bacterium from the genus of Oceanisphaera which has been isolated from sediments from the coast of the Bohai Sea in China.
