= Oceanimonas baumannii =

Scientific classification
- Domain: Bacteria
- Kingdom: Pseudomonadati
- Phylum: Pseudomonadota
- Class: Gammaproteobacteria
- Order: Aeromonadales
- Family: Aeromonadaceae
- Genus: Oceanimonas
- Species: O. baumannii

Binomial name
- Oceanimonas baumannii Brown et al. 2001

Type strain
- ATCC 700832, DSM 15594, NCIMB 13685, strain GB6

Synonyms
- Oceanomonas baumannii

Genus of bacteria

Oceanimonas baumannii is a Gram-negative and motile bacterium from the genus of Oceanimonas which has been isolated from estuarine mud from the River Wear in England.
