= Oceanisphaera sediminis =

Scientific classification
- Domain: Bacteria
- Kingdom: Pseudomonadati
- Phylum: Pseudomonadota
- Class: Gammaproteobacteria
- Order: Aeromonadales
- Family: Aeromonadaceae
- Genus: Oceanisphaera
- Species: O. sediminis

Binomial name
- Oceanisphaera sediminis Shin et al. 2012

Type strain
- JCM 17329, KACC 15117, TW92, TW93

Genus of bacteria

Oceanisphaera sediminis is a Gram-negative, aerobic and motile bacterium from the genus of Oceanisphaera which has been isolated from marine sediments from the coast of Korea.
