= Oceanimonas marisflavi =

Scientific classification
- Domain: Bacteria
- Kingdom: Pseudomonadati
- Phylum: Pseudomonadota
- Class: Gammaproteobacteria
- Order: Aeromonadales
- Family: Aeromonadaceae
- Genus: Oceanimonas
- Species: O. marisflavi

Binomial name
- Oceanimonas marisflavi Lee et al. 2018

Type strain
- DSM 106032, JCM 32358, KCTC 62271, 102-Na3

Genus of bacteria

Oceanimonas marisflavi is a Gram-negative, strictly aerobic, rod-shaped and motile bacterium from the genus of Oceanimonas. Oceanimonas marisflavi is able to degrade polycyclic aromatic hydrocarbons.
