= Pseudaeromonas paramecii =

Scientific classification
- Domain: Bacteria
- Kingdom: Pseudomonadati
- Phylum: Pseudomonadota
- Class: Gammaproteobacteria
- Order: Aeromonadales
- Family: Aeromonadaceae
- Genus: Pseudaeromonas
- Species: P. paramecii

Binomial name
- Pseudaeromonas paramecii Akter and Shin 2018

Type strain
- JCM 32226, KCTC 62038, strain PCS8

Genus of bacteria

Pseudaeromonas paramecii is a Gram-negative, rod-shaped and motile bacterium from the genus of Pseudaeromonas which has been isolated from the ciliate Paramecium caudatum.
