= Zobellella aerophila =

Scientific classification
- Domain: Bacteria
- Kingdom: Pseudomonadati
- Phylum: Pseudomonadota
- Class: Gammaproteobacteria
- Order: Aeromonadales
- Family: Aeromonadaceae
- Genus: Zobellella
- Species: Z. aerophila

Binomial name
- Zobellella aerophila Yi et al. 2011

Type strain
- JCM 17110, KACC 15081, JC2671

Genus of bacteria

Zobellella aerophila is a strictly aerobic, rod-shaped and motile bacterium from the genus of Zobellella which has been isolated from seashore sand from Dokdo in Korea.
