= Oceanisphaera donghaensis =

Scientific classification
- Domain: Bacteria
- Kingdom: Pseudomonadati
- Phylum: Pseudomonadota
- Class: Gammaproteobacteria
- Order: Aeromonadales
- Family: Aeromonadaceae
- Genus: Oceanisphaera
- Species: O. donghaensis

Binomial name
- Oceanisphaera donghaensis Park et al. 2006

Type strain
- DSM 17589, KCTC 12522, strain BL1

Synonyms
- Oceanisphaera koreensis

Genus of bacteria

Oceanisphaera donghaensis is a Gram-negative, aerobic and moderately halophilic bacterium from the genus of Oceanisphaera which has been isolated from marine sediments from the Sea of Japan in Korea.
