= Pseudaeromonas sharmana =

Scientific classification
- Domain: Bacteria
- Kingdom: Pseudomonadati
- Phylum: Pseudomonadota
- Class: Gammaproteobacteria
- Order: Aeromonadales
- Family: Aeromonadaceae
- Genus: Pseudaeromonas
- Species: P. sharmana

Binomial name
- Pseudaeromonas sharmana (Saha and Chakrabarti 2006) Padakandla and Chae 2017

Type strain
- DSM 17445, MTCC 7090, GPTSA-6

Synonyms
- Aeromonas sharmana, Halophoba aquatica, Manjusharmella aquatica, Manjusharmia caldifontis

Genus of bacteria

Pseudaeromonas sharmana is a Gram-negative and facultatively anaerobic bacterium from the genus of Pseudaeromonas which has been isolated from warm spring water from Jorhat, India.
