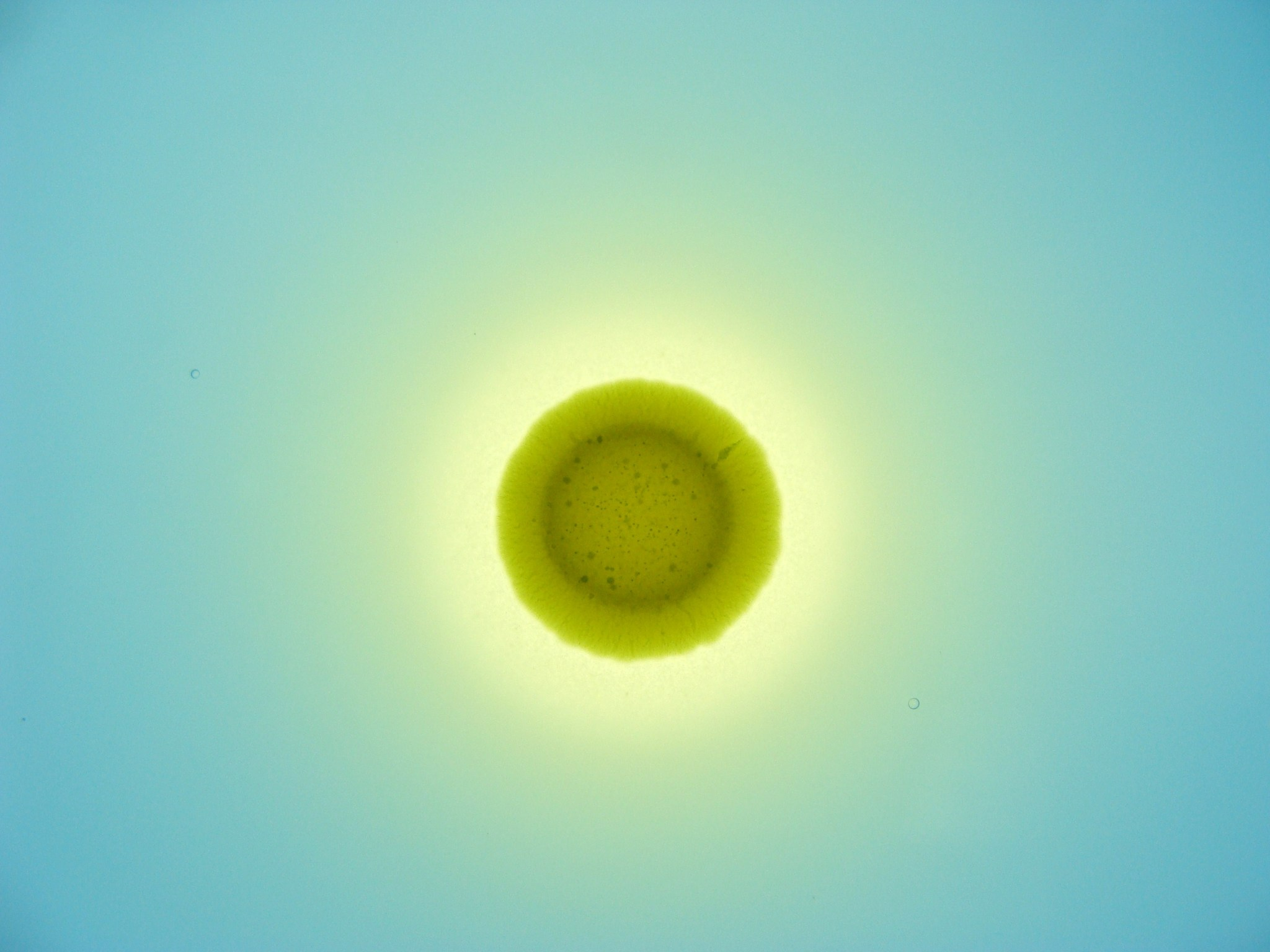

Scientific classification
- Domain: Bacteria
- Kingdom: Pseudomonadati
- Phylum: Pseudomonadota
- Class: Gammaproteobacteria
- Order: Aeromonadales
- Family: Aeromonadaceae
- Genus: Aeromonas
- Species: A. caviae

Binomial name
- Aeromonas caviae Popoff 1984

Type strain
- A 309, ATCC 15468, B. Austin BA-31, CCM 4491, CCRC 16001, CCUG 25939, CECT 838, CGMCC 1.1960, CIP 7616, CNCTC 5716, CNCTC Aer 24/88, CUETM 84/235, DSM 30190, DSM 7323, IMET 11045, JCM 1060, Kosako 71, LMG 12160, LMG 3775, M.Y. Popoff 545, NCAIM B.01931, NCIMB 13016, NCTC 12244, NRRL B-968, Sakazaki 71, WDCM 00062

Synonyms
- Aeromonas punctata, Pseudomonas punctata, Pseudomonas caviae, Bacillus punctatus, Aeromonas punctata subsp. punctata, Aeromonas punctata subsp. caviae, Aeromonas punctata caviae, Aeromonas hydrophila anaerogenes, Aeromonas formicans, Aeromonas dourgesi anaerogene

= Aeromonas caviae =

Species of bacterium

Aeromonas caviae is a Gram-negative bacterium of the genus Aeromonas isolated from epizootic guinea pigs.
