= Oceanimonas =

Scientific classification
- Domain: Bacteria
- Kingdom: Pseudomonadati
- Phylum: Pseudomonadota
- Class: Gammaproteobacteria
- Order: Aeromonadales
- Family: Aeromonadaceae
- Genus: Oceanimonas corrig. Brown et al. 2001

Type species
- Oceanimonas doudoroffii

Species
- O. baumannii O. doudoroffii O. marisflavi O. smirnovii

Genus of bacteria

The Oceanimonas are a genus of marine bacteria. They are, like all Proteobacteria, gram-negative. The rod-shaped, motile organisms are aerobic and chemoorganotroph.
