= Oceanisphaera =

Scientific classification
- Domain: Bacteria
- Kingdom: Pseudomonadati
- Phylum: Pseudomonadota
- Class: Gammaproteobacteria
- Order: Aeromonadales
- Family: Aeromonadaceae
- Genus: Oceanisphaera; Romanenko et al. 2003

Type species
- Oceanisphaera litoralis

Species
- O. arctica O. aquimarina O. avium O. donghaensis O. litoralis O. marina O. ostreae O. profunda O. psychrotolerans O. sediminis

Genus of bacteria

Oceanisphaera is a Gram-negative and non-spore-forming genus of bacteria from the family of Aeromonadaceae.
