= Zobellella =

Scientific classification
- Domain: Bacteria
- Kingdom: Pseudomonadati
- Phylum: Pseudomonadota
- Class: Gammaproteobacteria
- Order: Aeromonadales
- Family: Aeromonadaceae
- Genus: Zobellella; Lin and Shieh 2006

Type species
- Zobellella denitrificans

Species
- Z. aerophila Z. denitrificans Z. endophytica Z. maritima Z. taiwanensis

Genus of bacteria

Zobellella is a genus of bacteria from the family of Aeromonadaceae. Zobellella is named after the marine microbiologist C. E. ZoBell.
