= Tolumonas =

Scientific classification
- Domain: Bacteria
- Kingdom: Pseudomonadati
- Phylum: Pseudomonadota
- Class: Gammaproteobacteria
- Order: Aeromonadales
- Family: Aeromonadaceae
- Genus: Tolumonas; Fischer-Romero et al. 1996

Species
- Tolumonas auensis Tolumonas lignilytica Tolumonas osonensis

Genus of bacteria

Tolumonas is a genus of Gram-negative bacteria. It grows under aerobic and anaerobic conditions and is nonmotile. The cells are rods and occur in pairs or singly. It is known for one of its species biological bacterial production of toluene from phenylalanine and other phenyl precursors
