= Pseudaeromonas =

Scientific classification
- Domain: Bacteria
- Kingdom: Pseudomonadati
- Phylum: Pseudomonadota
- Class: Gammaproteobacteria
- Order: Aeromonadales
- Family: Aeromonadaceae
- Genus: Pseudaeromonas; Padakandla and Chae 2017

Type species
- Pseudaeromonas sharmana

Species
- P. paramecii P. pectinilytica P. sharmana

Genus of bacteria

Pseudaeromonas is a genus of bacteria from the family of Aeromonadaceae.
