= Cutaneous Streptococcus iniae infection =

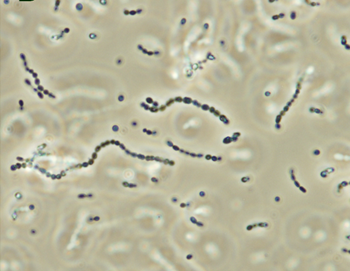
- Phase contrast micrograph of Streptococcus iniae, strain QMA0076
- Specialty: Dermatology

Cutaneous Streptococcus iniae infections cause a cellulitis of the hands, usually after a person handles tilapia, as this bacterium is a fish pathogen.

== See also ==
- Streptococcus iniae
- Skin lesion
