= Aeromonas veronii =

Scientific classification
- Domain: Bacteria
- Kingdom: Pseudomonadati
- Phylum: Pseudomonadota
- Class: Gammaproteobacteria
- Order: Aeromonadales
- Family: Aeromonadaceae
- Genus: Aeromonas
- Species: A. veronii

Binomial name
- Aeromonas veronii Hickman-Brenner et al., 1987

Synonyms
- Aeromonas culicicola

Species of bacterium

Aeromonas veronii is a Gram-negative, rod-shaped bacterium found in fresh water and in association with animals. In humans A. veronii can cause diseases ranging from wound infections and diarrhea to sepsis in immunocompromised patients. In leeches, this bacterium is thought to function as a symbiote aiding in the digestion of blood, provision of nutrients, or preventing other bacteria from growing. Humans treated with medicinal leeches after vascular surgery can be at risk for infection from A. veronii and are commonly placed on prophylactic antibiotics. Most commonly ciprofloxacin is used but there have been reports of resistant strains leading to infection.

== Protective effect ==
A 2005 study showed the potential for using probiotics for controlling Streptococcus iniae infection in trout. This study used the gastrointestinal contents of rainbow trout to screen for bacteria that inhibited growth of S. iniae and Lactococcus garvieae. They identified A. veronii as a potential candidate for control of S. iniae and L. garvieae infections in aquaculture. A. veronii, given live in the feed, protected the trout when challenged with S. iniae or L. garvieae.
