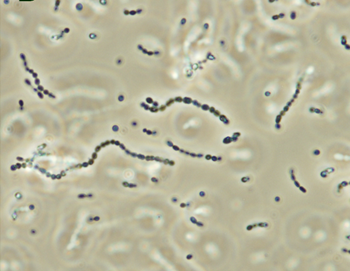
- Phase contrast micrograph of S. iniae colonies stained with streptavidin-FITC

Scientific classification
- Domain: Bacteria
- Kingdom: Bacillati
- Phylum: Bacillota
- Class: Bacilli
- Order: Lactobacillales
- Family: Streptococcaceae
- Genus: Streptococcus
- Species: S. iniae

Binomial name
- Streptococcus iniae Pier, 1976

Synonyms
- Streptococcus shiloi (Eldar, 1994)

= Streptococcus iniae =

Species of bacterium

Streptococcus iniae is a species of Gram-positive, sphere-shaped bacterium belonging to the genus Streptococcus. Since its isolation from an Amazon freshwater dolphin in the 1970s, S. iniae has emerged as a leading fish pathogen in aquaculture operations worldwide, resulting in over US$100M in annual losses. Since its discovery, S. iniae infections have been reported in at least 27 species of cultured or wild fish from around the world. Freshwater and saltwater fish including tilapia, red drum, hybrid striped bass, and rainbow trout are among those susceptible to infection by S. iniae. Infections in fish manifest as meningoencephalitis, skin lesions, and septicemia.

S. iniae has occasionally produced infection in humans, especially fish handlers of Asian descent. Human infections include sepsis, toxic shock syndrome, and inflammation of the skin, intervertebral discs, or inner layer of the heart. Identifying S. iniae in the laboratory can be difficult, since the conventional methods used to identify streptococci yield insufficient results. It cannot be grouped by the Lancefield antigen method typically used to categorize Streptococcus species. The two known serotypes can be distinguished biochemically by differences in enzyme activity. Several antibiotics have been used to treat S. iniae infections.

== History ==
Streptococcus iniae was first isolated in 1972, from subcutaneous abscesses in a captive specimen of Amazon river dolphin (Inia geoffrensis) suffering from an infection known as "golf ball disease". The bacterium was found to be sensitive to beta-lactam antibiotics, and the dolphin was treated successfully with penicillin and tylosin. The causative organism was recognized to be a new species of Streptococcus, and was given the name Streptococcus iniae in 1976. Around this time, other streptococcal outbreaks occurred in Asia, and the US; some strains associated with the Japanese outbreaks were later suggested to be S. iniae.

In the 1980s, a purported new species of Streptococcus, named S. shiloi, was identified as one of the causes of an epidemic of meningoencephalitis (an inflammation of the brain and its surrounding membranes) affecting farmed rainbow trout and tilapia in Israel since 1986. Since S. shiloi was alpha-hemolytic, had a G+C% content of 37% and did not ferment sugar galactose, it was not classified as S. iniae, which is beta-hemolytic, has a G+C% content of 32%, and ferments galactose. In 1995, S. shiloi was found in fact to be beta-hemolytic, and after DNA-DNA hybridization techniques with the ATCC type S. iniae and recalculation of the G+C% content, was reclassified by the same group as a junior synonym of S. iniae.

Phylogenetic analyses based on 16S ribosomal DNA suggest that S. iniae is closely related to other streptococcal pathogens of humans and animals. Specifically, it is clustered in the pyogenic group, along with other pathogenic streptococci such as S. pyogenes, S. agalactiae, S. uberis, S. canis, S. porcinus, S. phocae, and S. intestinalis. Of these related species, it is most closely related to S. porcinus. Genomic restriction fragment analysis of diverse host and geographical panels of S. iniae isolates has shown common profiles between virulent fish and human strains, though multiple pulsed field gel electrophoresis patterns have been identified among human isolates.

== Identification ==
Hemolyses of Streptococcus spp. (left) α-hemolysis; (middle) β-hemolysis; (right) γ-hemolysis (= nonhemolytic)

S. iniae may be easily misidentified (or not identified at all) by conventional automated microbiology systems. Molecular genetics methods, such as DNA sequencing and DNA-DNA hybridization, can be useful for correct identification, although work by the U.S. Centers for Disease Control and Prevention has suggested they are unnecessary in most cases. Several groups have used 16S rDNA sequencing to identify S. iniae isolates, and while it can differentiate this species from other related species, such as S. porcinus and S. uberis, 16S sequencing cannot be used to differentiate between strains of S. iniae. Ribotyping is a similar method, by which 16S and 23S rRNA genes are digested with restriction endonucleases and Southern blotted using species-specific oligonucleotide probes. This method is more sensitive than 16S rDNA sequencing, as in addition to species differentiation, it can be used to differentiate between strains. Ribotyping was used in 1997 to differentiate between Israeli and American strains, thus ruling out the possibility of an epidemiological link between outbreaks in the two countries.

S. iniae is beta-hemolytic when incubated in anaerobic conditions, although it may be misidentified as alpha-hemolytic because, in some strains, zones of beta-hemolysis (complete destruction of red blood cells in the blood agar culture medium) are surrounded by large zones of alpha-hemolysis (incomplete destruction of red blood cells with a greenish discoloration due to breakdown of hemoglobin). The bacterium is catalase-negative and LAP-positive (like all streptococci), PYR-test and CAMP-test-positive, does not hydrolyze sodium hippurate, and does not grow in bile esculin agar. It does not express any of the known Lancefield antigens.

=== Serotypes ===
Two serotypes of S. iniae are established. The ATCC 29178 type strain first characterized in 1976 by Pier and Madin is representative of serotype I isolates. Serotype II was first identified as the type strain (ATCC 29177) isolated from another dolphin case of "golf ball disease". A biochemical assay measuring arginine dihydrolase activity has been used to distinguish between serotypes (serotype I is positive), though proposed hyperencapsulation of serotype II may represent the most significant functional difference between the two types.

== Role in disease ==
=== In fish ===
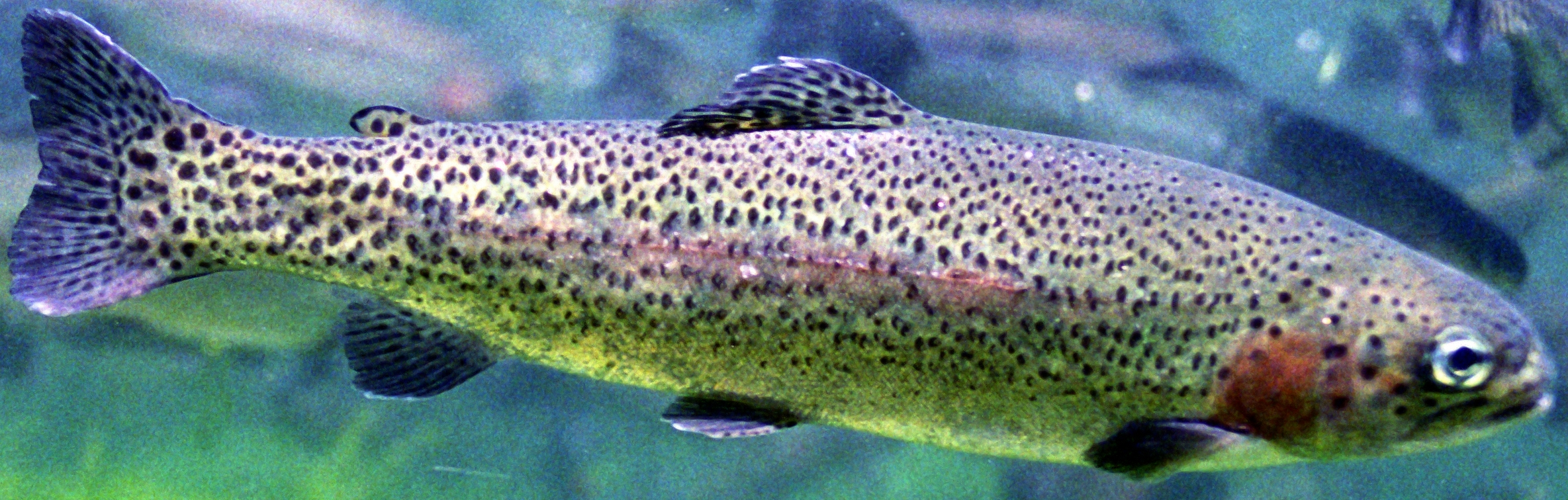
Epizootics of S. iniae infection in rainbow trout (healthy specimen pictured) have occurred in Israel and Japan.

S. iniae is highly pathogenic in freshwater, marine, and euryhaline fish, and is highly lethal: outbreaks may be associated with 30–50% mortality. It is, therefore, one of the foremost economically important pathogens in intensive aquaculture. In 1997, the global economic impact of S. iniae infection to the aquaculture industry was estimated at US$100 million (one-tenth of which in the United States). As of 2007, infection had been reported in 27 species of fish, including tilapia (genus Oreochromis and Tilapia), rainbow trout (Oncorhynchus mykiss), coho salmon (Oncorhynchus kisutch), Japanese amberjack (Seriola quinqueradiata), red drum (Sciaenops ocellatus), and barramundi (Lates calcarifer, which can be an asymptomatic carrier). Common carp (Cyprinus carpio), channel catfish (Ictalurus punctatus), and goldfish (Carassius auratus) appear to be resistant. Fish raised in intensive aquaculture operations and subject to environmental stressors (i.e. suboptimal temperature, poor water quality, crowding, handling, etc.) are most prone to S. iniae infection. Wild fish populations located both near and far from aquaculture operations have also proven susceptible to S. iniae infection.

The site of S. iniae infection and its clinical presentation vary from species to species. In tilapia, S. iniae causes meningoencephalitis, with symptoms including lethargy, dorsal rigidity, and erratic swimming behavior; death follows in a matter of days. In rainbow trout, it is typically associated with septicemia and central nervous system damage. Symptoms are consistent with septicemia, and include lethargy and loss of orientation (as in tilapia), exophthalmia, corneal opacity, and external and internal bleeding.

=== In humans ===
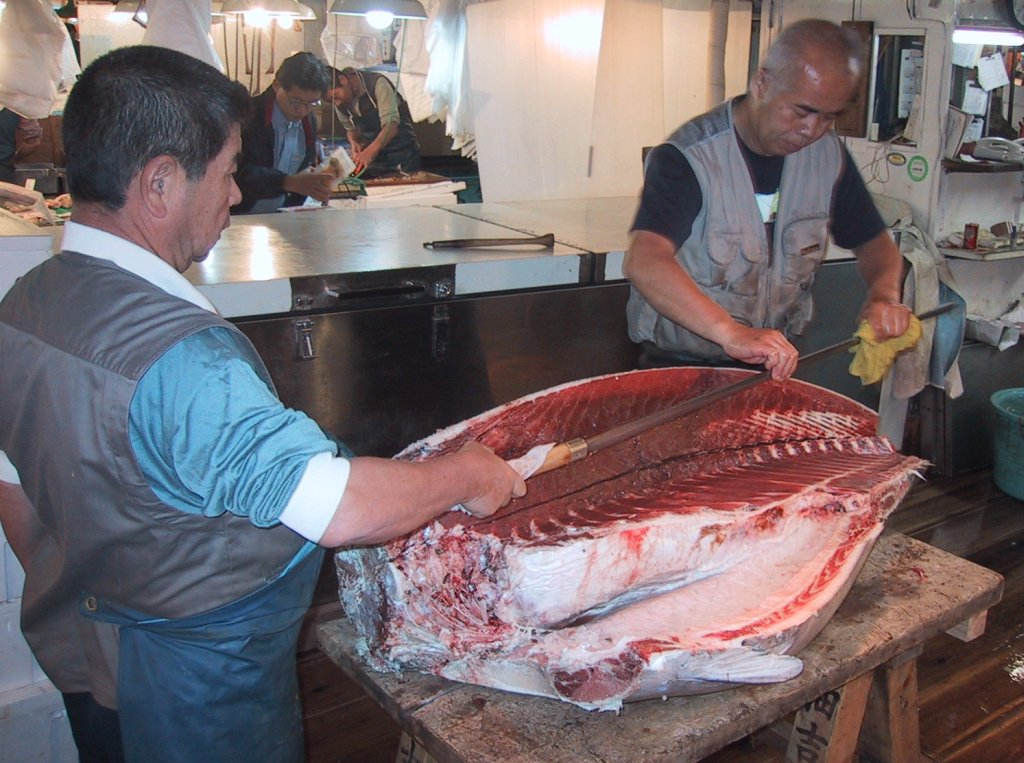
Most human S. iniae infections are associated with injuries while handling live or fresh infected fish.

S. iniae can cause opportunistic infections in weakened or immunocompromised humans. It is most commonly associated with bacteremic cellulitis, but has been known to cause endocarditis, meningitis, osteomyelitis, and septic arthritis. The first recognized cases of human infection occurred in Texas in 1991 and in Ottawa in 1994, but the sources of infection were not determined. Human infection with S. iniae was also identified in Toronto between 15 and 20 December 1995, when three Asian patients were admitted to a hospital with cellulitis of the hand after injuring themselves while handling raw fish. All three were found to have bacteremia, initially attributed to Streptococcus uberis, but later correctly identified as S. iniae. In February 1996, a Chinese man was admitted to the same hospital with sepsis one week after preparing a fresh whole tilapia, and was also diagnosed with S. iniae bacteremia. A subsequent epidemiological investigation found other cases in the Toronto area, for a total of nine patients; all were of Asian descent and all had handled raw fish (mostly tilapia) before developing infection. Other cases were later identified in the United States and elsewhere in Canada, and have since been reported in Asia (Hong Kong, Taiwan, and Singapore). Asian descent is a common trend in the majority of invasive human cases, but it is unknown whether this is due to inherent differences in immunity or because of cultural differences in the fish preparation which lend themselves to a higher incidence of infection.

=== Control and treatment ===
Several measures can be taken to control infection in aquaculture once an S. iniae outbreak has been confirmed. Decreasing the quantity of feed given to fish has been shown to reduce mortality rates, as the uptake of bacteria in water is expedited by feeding. Decreasing the density of the fish stock increases survival by reducing injury to fish and lowering the general stress level in the population. Lowering the water temperature and keeping optimal oxygen levels has also been shown to reduce stress to fish and inhibit bacterial growth.

A 2005 study showed the potential for using probiotics for controlling S. iniae infection in trout. This study used the gastrointestinal contents of rainbow trout to scan for bacteria that inhibited growth of S. iniae and Lactococcus garvieae. They identified Aeromonas sobria as a potential candidate for control of S. iniae and L. garvieae infections in aquaculture. A. sobria, given live in the feed, protected the trout when challenged with S. iniae or L. garvieae.

Several antibiotics have been used successfully to treat S. iniae infection in fish. Enrofloxacin, a quinolone antibiotic, has been used to great effect in hybrid striped bass (Morone chrysops × M. saxatilis), although evidence suggested the development of a resistant strain during this trial. Amoxicillin, erythromycin, furazolidone, and oxytetracycline have also been used (the last with varying success, only in barramundi). Vaccination against S. iniae has been attempted with limited success as it only provides up to 6 months' immunity.

Penicillin has been suggested as the drug of choice for the treatment of S. iniae infection in mammals, including humans. In the 1995–1996 cluster of human cases, all clinical isolates were susceptible to penicillin, several cephalosporins, clindamycin, erythromycin, and co-trimoxazole (MICs 0.25 μg/ml); all nine patients were treated with parenteral beta-lactam antibiotics and recovered uneventfully. A study of isolates submitted to the Centers for Disease Control and Prevention between 2000 and 2004 found all to be sensitive to beta-lactams, macrolides, quinolones, and vancomycin.
