= Streptococcus uberis =

Scientific classification
- Domain: Bacteria
- Kingdom: Bacillati
- Phylum: Bacillota
- Class: Bacilli
- Order: Lactobacillales
- Family: Streptococcaceae
- Genus: Streptococcus
- Species: S. uberis

Binomial name
- Streptococcus uberis Diernhofer 1932 (Approved Lists 1980)

Species of bacterium

Streptococcus uberis is a species of Streptococcus. It is one of the most common causes of mastitis in dairy cattle. S. uberis KJ2 is put in oral probiotics and sold, the efficacy of this is contested.
