= Plate count agar =

Non-selective microbiological growth medium

Plate count agar (PCA), also called standard methods agar (SMA), is a microbiological growth medium commonly used to assess or to monitor "total" or viable bacterial growth of a sample. PCA is not a selective medium.

The total number of living aerobic bacteria can be determined using a plate count agar which is a substrate for bacteria to grow on. The medium contains casein which provides nitrogen, carbon, amino acids, vitamins and minerals to aid in the growth of the organism. Yeast extract is the source for vitamins, particularly of B-group. Glucose is the fermentable carbohydrate and agar is the solidifying agent. This is a non-selective medium and the bacteria is counted as colony forming units per gram (CFU/g) in solid samples and (CFU/ml) in liquid samples.

== Pour plate technique ==
The pour plate technique is the typical technique used to prepare plate count agars. Here, the inoculum is added to the molten agar before pouring the plate. The molten agar is cooled to about 45 degrees Celsius and is poured using a sterile method into a petri dish containing a specific diluted sample. From here, the plates are rotated to ensure the samples are uniformly mixing with the agar. Incubation of the plates is the next step and is carried out for about 3 days at 20 to 30 degrees Celsius.

== Composition ==
Ingredients
enzymatic digest of casein/tryptone	5.0 g/L
yeast extract	2.5 g/L
glucose	1.0 g/L
agar	15.0 g/L

== Benefits ==
- easy to perform
- larger sample volume than the surface spread method allowing for detection of lower microbiological concentrations
- agar surface does not have to be pre-dried
- number of microbes/ mL in a specimen can be determined
- previously prepared plates are not needed
- possibility of determination of bacterial contamination of foods

== Obtaining isolated colonies from plate count agars ==
Once a plate has been successfully prepared, plate count agar cells will grow into colonies which can be sufficiently isolated to determine the original cell type. The colony-forming unit (CFU) is an appropriate description of the colony's origin. In plate counts, colonies are counted, but the count is usually recorded in CFU. Due to the fact that colonies growing on plates may begin as either a single cell or a cluster of cells, CFU allows for a correct description of the cell density. The streak plate method helps identify the unknown microbe by producing individual colonies on an agar plate which allows for CFU method to be used:

1. Beginning the streak pattern. Label the base of the plate. Then, visualize the plate in four quadrants:
  - top left (I),
  - top right (II),
  - bottom right (III),
  - bottom left (IV).

Streak the mixed culture back and forth in the first quadrant (top left) of the agar plate. Do not cut the agar, simply scrape the top. Flame the loop to rid of culture residue. Wait for it to cool for the next quadrant.

1. Streaking again. Proceed to the second quadrant with streaking. Streaks on the medium will overlap. Flame the loop to rid of culture residue. Wait for it to cool for the next quadrant.
2. Streaking yet again. Rotate the plate 180 degrees to get a proper streaking angle in the third quadrant. Be sure to cool the loops before streaking in quadrant four.
3. Streaking in the center. Streak one last time beginning in quadrant four and into the center of the plate. Flame the loops. Incubate the plate for assigned time and appropriate temperature.
