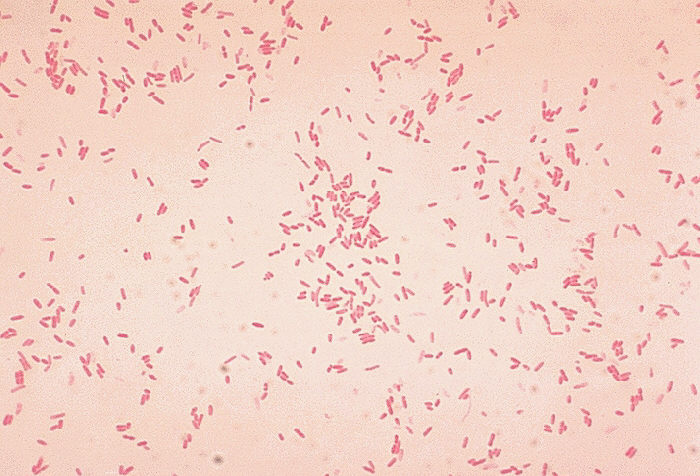
- Aeromonas hydrophila

Scientific classification
- Domain: Bacteria
- Kingdom: Pseudomonadati
- Phylum: Pseudomonadota
- Class: Gammaproteobacteria
- Order: Aeromonadales
- Family: Aeromonadaceae

Genera
- Aeromonas; Dongshaea; Oceanimonas; Oceanisphaera; Pseudaeromonas; Tolumonas; Zobellella

= Aeromonadaceae =

Family of bacteria

The Aeromonadaceae are Gram-negative bacteria. The species are facultative anaerobic organisms. The cells are rod-shaped. They are mostly found in estuarine waters and fresh water, also in soil and sewage. Some are pathogenic for humans and other animals such as fishes and frogs.
