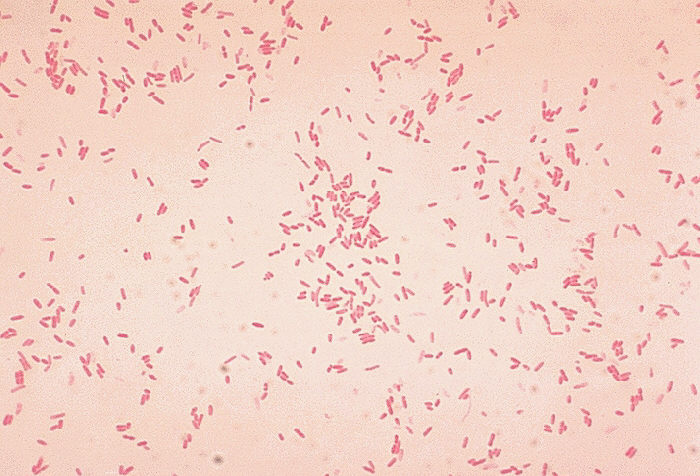
- Aeromonas hydrophila

Scientific classification
- Domain: Bacteria
- Kingdom: Pseudomonadati
- Phylum: Pseudomonadota
- Class: Gammaproteobacteria
- Order: Aeromonadales; Martin-Carnahan and Joseph, 2005

Families
- Aeromonadaceae; Succinivibrionaceae

= Aeromonadales =

Order of bacteria

The Aeromonadales are an order of Pseudomonadota, with 10 genera in two families. The species are anaerobic. The cells are rod-shaped. Some species of this order are motile by a single polar flagellum; others are not motile.
